Jean Henri Gaston Giraud (8 May 1938 – 10 March 2012) was a French artist, cartoonist and writer who worked in the Franco-Belgian bandes dessinées (BD) tradition. Giraud garnered worldwide acclaim predominantly under the pseudonym Mœbius for his fantasy/science-fiction work, and to a slightly lesser extent as Gir, which he used for the Blueberry series and his other Western themed work, particularly valued in continental Europe. Esteemed by Federico Fellini, Stan Lee, and Hayao Miyazaki, among others, he has been described as the most influential bande dessinée artist after Hergé.

His most famous works include the series Blueberry, created with writer Jean-Michel Charlier, featuring one of the first antiheroes in Western comics. As Mœbius, he created a wide range of science-fiction and fantasy comics in a highly imaginative, surreal, almost abstract style. These works include Arzach and the Airtight Garage of Jerry Cornelius. He also collaborated with avant-garde filmmaker Alejandro Jodorowsky for an unproduced adaptation of Dune and the comic book series The Incal.

Mœbius also contributed storyboards and concept designs to numerous science-fiction and fantasy films, such as Alien, Tron, The Fifth Element, and The Abyss. Blueberry was adapted for the screen in 2004 by French director Jan Kounen.

Early life
Jean Giraud was born in Nogent-sur-Marne, Val-de-Marne, in the suburbs of Paris, on 8 May 1938, as the only child to Raymond Giraud, an insurance agent, and Pauline Vinchon, who had worked at the agency. When he was three years old, his parents divorced, and he was raised mainly by his grandparents, who were living in the neighboring municipality of Fontenay-sous-Bois (much later, when he was an acclaimed artist, Giraud returned to live in the municipality in the mid-1970s, but was unable to buy his grandparents' house). The rupture between mother and father created a lasting trauma that he explained lay at the heart of his choice of separate pen names. An introverted child at first, young Giraud found solace after World War II in a small theater, located on a corner in the street where his mother lived, which concurrently provided an escape from the dreary atmosphere in postwar reconstruction-era France. Playing an abundance of American B-movie Westerns, Giraud, frequenting the theater there as often as he was able to, developed a passion for the genre, as did so many other European boys his age in those times.

At age 9–10, Giraud started to draw Western comics while enrolled by his single mother as a stop-gap measure in the Saint-Nicolas boarding school in Issy-les-Moulineaux for two years (and where he became acquainted with Belgian comic magazines such as Spirou and Tintin), much to the amusement of his schoolmates. In 1954, at age 16, he began his only technical training at the École Supérieure des Arts Appliqués Duperré, where he started producing Western comics, though these did not sit well with his conventional teachers. With Mézières in particular, in no small part due to their shared passion for science fiction, Westerns and the Far West, Giraud developed a close, lifelong friendship, calling him "life's continuing adventure" in later life. In 1956, he left art school without graduating to visit his mother, who had married a Mexican in Mexico, and stayed there for nine months.

The experience of the Mexican desert, in particular its endless blue skies and unending flat plains, now seeing and experiencing for himself the vistas that had enthralled him so much when watching Westerns on the silver screen only a few years earlier, left an everlasting, "quelque chose qui m'a littéralement craqué l'âme" (something which literally cracked my soul), enduring impression on him, easily recognizable in almost all of his later seminal works. After his return to France, he started to work as a full-time tenured artist for Catholic publisher , to whom he was introduced by Mézières, who had shortly before found employment at the publisher. In 1959–1960, he was slated for military service in, firstly the French occupation zone of Germany, and subsequently Algeria, in the throes of the vicious Algerian War at the time. Fortunately for him, however, he somehow managed to escape frontline duty as he – being the only service man available at the time with a graphics background – served out his military obligations being set to work as illustrator on the army magazine 5/5 Forces Françaises, besides being assigned to logistic duties. Algeria was Giraud's second acquaintance with other, more exotic cultures, and like he did in Mexico, he soaked in the experience, which made another indelible impression on the young man born as a suburban city boy, leaving its traces in his later comics, especially those created as "Mœbius".

Career

Western comics
At 18, Giraud was drawing his own humorous, Morris-inspired, Western comic two-page shorts, Frank et Jeremie, for the magazine Far West, his first freelance commercial sales. Magazine editor Marijac thought young Giraud was gifted with a knack for humorous comics, but none whatsoever for realistically drawn comics, and advised him to continue in the vein of "Frank et Jeremie".

Fleurus (1956–1958)
Tenured at publisher Fleurus from 1956 to 1958 after his first sales, Giraud did so, but concurrently continued to steadfastly create realistically drawn Western comics (alongside several others of a French historical nature) and illustrations for magazine editorials in their magazines Fripounet et Marisette, Cœurs Vaillants, and  – all of them of a strong, edifying nature aimed at France's adolescent youth – up to a point that his realistically drawn comics had become his mainstay. Among his realistic Westerns was a comic called "Le roi des bisons" ("King of the Buffalo" – has had an English publication), and another called "Un géant chez lez Hurons" ("A Giant with the Hurons").<ref>SCHTROUMPf, Les cahier de la bande dessinee, issue 25, Grenoble:Glénat Editions, 1974, pp. 38–39; These two stories were the only serialized ones in any of the Fleurus magazines, running far longer than the 2- to 4-page shorts Giraud usually produced for the magazines. "Un géant chez lez Hurons" ran for 19 pages in Cœurs Valiants, issues 30-48, 1957, whereas "Le roi des bisons'" ran for 10 pages in issues 29-38, 1958.</ref> Actually, several of his Western comics, including "King of the Buffalo", featured the same protagonist Art Howell, and these can be considered as Giraud's de facto first realistic Western series, as he himself did in effect, since he, save the first one, endowed these stories with the subtitle "Un aventure d'Art Howell". For Fleurus, Giraud also illustrated his first three books. Already in this period, his style was heavily influenced by his later mentor, Belgian comic artist Joseph "Jijé" Gillain, who at that time was the major source of inspiration for an entire generation of young, aspiring French comic artists, including Giraud's friend Mézières, interested in doing realistically drawn comics. How major Jijé's influence was on these young artists, was amply demonstrated by the Fleurus publications these youngsters submitted their work to, as their work strongly resembled each other. For example, two of the books Giraud illustrated for Fleurus, were co-illustrated with Guy Mouminoux, another name of some future renown in the Franco-Belgian comic world, and Giraud's work can only be identified, because he signed his work, whereas Mouminoux did not sign his. While not ample, Giraud's earnings at Fleurus were just enough to allow him – disenchanted as he was with the courses, prevalent atmosphere, and academic discipline – to quit his art academy education after only two years, though he came to somewhat regret the decision in later life.

Jijé apprenticeship (1961–1962)
Shortly before he entered military service, Giraud visited his idol at his home for the first time with Mézières and Mallet, followed by a few visits on his own to see the master at work for himself. In 1961, returning from military service and his stint on 5/5 Forces Françaises, Giraud, not wanting to return to Fleurus, as he felt that he "had to do something else, if he ever wanted to evolve", became an apprentice of Jijé on his invitation, after he saw that Giraud had made artistic progress during his stay at 5/5 Forces Françaises. Jijé was then one of the leading comic artists in Europe and known for his gracious tendency to voluntarily act as a mentor for young, aspiring comic artists, of whom Giraud was only one, going even as far as opening up his family home in Champrosay for days on end for these youngsters, which, again, included Giraud. In this, Jijé resembled Belgian comic grandmaster Hergé, but unlike Jijé, Hergé only did so on a purely commercial basis, never on a voluntarily one. For Jijé, Giraud created several other shorts and illustrations for the short-lived magazine Bonux-Boy (1960/61), his first comic work after military service, and his penultimate one before embarking on Blueberry. In this period, Jijé used his apprentice for the inks on an outing of his Western series Jerry Spring – after whom Giraud had, unsurprisingly, modeled his Art Howell character previously – "The Road to Coronado", which Giraud inked. Actually, Jijé had intended his promising pupil for the entirety of the story art, but the still-inexperienced Giraud, who was used to working under the relaxed conditions at Fleurus, found himself overwhelmed by the strict time schedules that production for a periodical (Spirou in this case) demanded. Conceding that he had been a bit too cocky and ambitious, Giraud stated, "I started the story all by myself, but after a week, I had only finished half a plate, and aside from being soaked with my sweat, it was a complete disaster. So Joseph went on to do the penciling, whereas I did the inks." Even though Giraud did lose touch with his mentor eventually, he never forgot what "his master" had provided him with, both "aesthetically and professionally", the fatherless Giraud gratefully stating in later life, "It was as if he had asked me «Do you want me to be your father?», and if by a miracle, I was provided with one, a[n] [comic] artist no less!".

Hachette (1962–1963)
After his stint at Jijé's, Giraud was again approached by friend Mézières to see if he was interested to work alongside him as an illustrator on Hachette's ambitious multivolume L'histoire des civilisations history reference work. Spurred on by Jijé, who considered the opportunity a wonderful one for his pupil, Giraud accepted. Though he considered the assignment a daunting one, having to create in oil paints from historical objects and imagery, it was, besides being the best-paying job he had ever had, a seminal appointment. The assignment at Hachette being cut short because of his invitation to embark on Fort Navajo, meant he only participated on the first three to four volumes of the book series, leaving the completion to Mézières. In the Pilote era, Giraud additionally provided art in gouache for two Western-themed vinyl record music productions as sleeve art, as well as the covers for the first seven outings in the French-language edition of the Morgan Kane Western novel series written by Louis Masterson. Much of his Western-themed gouache artwork of this era, including that of Blueberry, has been collected in the 1983 artbook "Le tireur solitaire".

Aside from its professional importance, Giraud's stint at Hachette was also of personal importance, as he met Claudine Conin, an editorial researcher at Hachette, and who described her future husband as being at the time "funny, uncomplicated, friendly, a nice boy next-door", but on the other hand, "mysterious, dark, intellectual", already recognizing that he had all the makings of a "visionary", long before others did. Married in 1967, after Giraud had become the recognized Blueberry artist, the couple had two children, Hélène (b:1970) and Julien (b:1972). Daughter Hélène in particular has inherited her father's graphics talents and has carved out a career as a graphics artist in the animation industry, earning her a 2014 French civilian knighthood, the same her father had already received in 1985. Besides raising their children, wife Claudine not only took care of the business aspects of her husband's art work, but has on occasion also contributed to it as colorist. The 1976 feminist fantasy short story, "La tarte aux pommes", was written by her under her maiden name. Additionally, the appearance of a later, major character in Giraud's Blueberry series, Chihuahua Pearl, was in part based on Claudine's looks. The Mœbiusienne 1973 fantasy road trip short story "La déviation", created as "Gir" before the artist fully embarked on his Mœbius career, featured the Giraud family as the protagonists, save Julien.

Pilote (1963–1974)
In October 1963, Giraud and writer Jean-Michel Charlier started the comic strip Fort Navajo for the Charlier-co-founded Pilote magazine, issue 210. At this time the affinity between the styles of Giraud and Jijé (who in effect had been Charlier's first choice for the series, but who was reverted to Giraud by Jijé) was so close that Jijé penciled several pages for the series when Giraud went AWOL. In effect, when "Fort Navajo" started its run, Pilote received angry letters, accusing Giraud of plagiarism, which was however foreseen by Jijé and Giraud. Shirking off the accusations, Jijé encouraged his former pupil to stay the course instead, thereby propping up his self-confidence. The first time Jijé had to fill in for Giraud, was during the production of the second story, "Thunder in the West" (1964), when the still inexperienced Giraud, buckling under the stress of having to produce a strictly scheduled magazine serial, suffered from a nervous breakdown, with Jijé taking on plates 28–36. The second time occurred one year later, during the production of "Mission to Mexico (The Lost Rider)", when Giraud unexpectedly packed up and left to travel the United States, and, again, Mexico; yet again former mentor Jijé came to the rescue by penciling plates 17–38.Jean-Marc Lofficier. 1989. "The Past Master", in Moebius 5: Blueberry. Graphitti designs. While the art style of both artists had been nearly indistinguishable from each other in "Thunder in the West", after Giraud resumed work on plate 39 of "Mission to Mexico", a clearly noticeable style breach was now observable, indicating that Giraud was now well on his way to develop his own signature style, eventually surpassing that of his former teacher Jijé, who, impressed by his former pupil's achievements, has later coined him the "Rimbaud de la BD".

The Lieutenant Blueberry character, whose facial features were based on those of the actor Jean-Paul Belmondo, was created in 1963 by Charlier (scenario) and Giraud (drawings) for Pilote.Dargaud archive: "C'est en 1963 qu'est créé ce  pour PILOTE par Charlier et Giraud." While the Fort Navajo series had originally been intended as an ensemble narrative, it quickly gravitated towards having Blueberry as its central figure. His featured adventures, in what was later called the Blueberry series, may be Giraud's best known work in native France and the rest of Europe, before later collaborations with Alejandro Jodorowsky. The early Blueberry comics used a simple line drawing style similar to that of Jijé, and standard Western themes and imagery (specifically, those of John Ford's US Cavalry Western trilogy, with Howard Hawk's 1959 Rio Bravo thrown in for good measure for the sixth, one-shot title "The Man with the Silver Star"), but gradually Giraud developed a darker and grittier style inspired by, firstly the 1970 Westerns Soldier Blue and Little Big Man (for the "Iron Horse" story-arc), and subsequently by the Spaghetti Westerns of Sergio Leone and the dark realism of Sam Peckinpah in particular (for the "Lost Goldmine" story-arc and beyond). With the fifth album, "The Trail of the Navajos", Giraud established his own style, and after both editorial control and censorship laws were loosened in the wake of the May 1968 social upheaval in France – the former in no small part due to the revolt key comic artists, Giraud chief among them, staged a short time thereafter in the editorial offices of Dargaud, the publisher of Pilote, demanding and ultimately receiving more creative freedom from editor-in-chief René Goscinny – the strip became more explicitly adult, and also adopted a thematically wider range. The first Blueberry album penciled by Giraud after he had begun publishing science fiction as Mœbius, "Nez Cassé" ("Broken Nose"), was much more experimental than his previous Western work. While the editorial revolt at Dargaud had effectively become the starting point of the emancipation of the French comic world, Giraud admitted that it also had caused a severe breach in his hitherto warm relationship with the conservative Goscinny, which never fully mended.

Giraud left the series and publisher in 1974, partly because he was tired of the publication pressure he was under in order to produce the series, partly because of an emerging royalties conflict, but mostly because he wanted further explore and develop his "Mœbius" alter ego, in particular because Jodorowsky, who was impressed by the graphic qualities of Blueberry, had already invited him to Los Angeles to start production design on his Dune movie project, and which constituted the first Jodorowsky/Mœbius collaboration. Giraud was so eager to return to the project during a stopover from the United States while the project was in hiatus, that he greatly accelerated the work on the "Angel Face" outing of Blueberry he was working on at the time, shearing off weeks from its originally intended completion. The project fell through though, and after he had returned definitely to France later that year, he started to produce comic work under this pseudonym that was published in the magazine he co-founded, Métal Hurlant, which started its run in December 1974 and revolutionized the Franco-Belgian comic world in the process.

It was Jodorowsky who introduced Giraud to the writings of Carlos Castaneda, who had written a series of books that describe his training in shamanism, particularly with a group whose lineage descended from the Toltecs. The books, narrated in the first person, related his experiences under the tutelage of a Yaqui "Man of Knowledge" named Don Juan Matus. Castaneda's writings made a deep and everlasting impression on Giraud, already open to Native-Mexican folk culture due to his three previous extended trips to the country (he had visited the country a third time in 1972), and it did influence his art as "Mœbius", particularly in regard to dream sequences, though he was not quite able to work in such influences in his mainstream Blueberry comic. Yet, unbeknownst to writer Charlier, he did already sneak in some Castaneda elements in "Nez Cassé". Castaneda's influence reasserted itself in full in Giraud's later life, having worked in elements more openly after Charlier's death in his 1999 Blueberry outing "Geronimo l'Apache", and was to become a major element for his Blueberry 1900-project, which however, had refused to come to fruition for extraneous reasons.Svane, 2003, p 35; Sadoul, 2015, p. 220

Even though Giraud had vainly tried to introduce his Blueberry co-worker to the writings of Castaneda, Charlier, being of a previous generation, conservative in nature and wary of science fiction in general, never understood what his younger colleague tried to achieve as "Mœbius". Nonetheless, he never tried to hinder Giraud in the least, as he understood that an artist of Giraud's caliber needed a "mental shower" from time to time. Furthermore, Charlier was very appreciative of the graphic innovations Giraud ported over from his work as "Mœbius" into the mainstream Blueberry series, most specifically "Nez Cassé", making him "one of the all-time greatest artists in the comic medium," as Charlier himself put it in 1982. Artist , who was taken on by Giraud in 1980 for the inks of "La longue marche" ("The Long March") painted a slightly different picture though. Already recognizing that the two men were living in different worlds, he noted that Charlier was not pleased with Giraud taking on an assistant, afraid that it might have been a prelude to his leaving the series in order to pursue his "experimentations" as Mœbius further. While Charlier was willing to overlook Giraud's "philandering" in his case only, he was otherwise of the firm conviction that artists, especially his own, should totally and wholeheartedly devote themselves to their craft, as Charlier had always considered the medium. Even Giraud was in later life led to believe that Charlier apparently "detested" his other work, looking upon it as something akin to "treason", though his personal experiences with the author was that he had kept an "open mind" in this regard, at least in his case. According to Giraud, Charlier's purported stance negatively influenced his son Philippe, causing their relationship to rapidly deteriorate into open animosity, after the death of his father.Sadoul, 2015, pp. 220-226

Post-Pilote (1979–2007)
Giraud returned to the Blueberry series in 1979 with "Nez Cassé" as a free-lancer. Later that year however, the long-running disagreement Charlier and Giraud had with their publishing house Dargaud, the publisher of Pilote, over the residuals from Blueberry came to a head. They began the Western comic Jim Cutlass as a means to put the pressure on Dargaud. It did not work, and Charlier and Giraud turned their back on the parent publisher definitively, leaving for greener pastures elsewhere, and in the process taking all of Charlier's other co-creations with them. It would be nearly fifteen years before the Blueberry series (and the others) returned to Dargaud after Charlier died. (For further particulars, including the royalties conflict, see: Blueberry publication history.)

When Charlier, Giraud's collaborator on Blueberry, died in 1989, Giraud assumed responsibility for the scripting of the main series, the last outing of which, "Apaches", released in 2007, became the last title Giraud created for the parent publisher. Blueberry has been translated into 19 languages, the first English book translations being published in 1977/78 by UK publisher Egmont/Methuen, though its publication was cut short after only four volumes. The original Blueberry series has spun off a prequel series called Young Blueberry in the Pilote-era (1968–1970), but the artwork was in 1984, when that series was resurrected, left to Colin Wilson and later  after the first three original volumes in that series, as well as the Giraud-written, but William Vance-penciled, 1991-2000 intermezzo series called Marshal Blueberry. All these series, except Jim Cutlass, had returned to the parent publisher Dargaud in late 1993, though Giraud himself – having already left the employ of the publisher in 1974 (see below) – had not, instead plying his trade as a free-lancer, explaining the Jim Cutlass exception.

While Giraud has garnered universal praise and acclaim for his work as "Mœbius" (especially in the US, the UK and Japan), as "Gir", Blueberry has always remained his most successful and most recognized work in native France itself and in mainland Europe, despite its artist developing somewhat of a love/hate relationship with his co-creation in later life, which was exemplified by his regularly taking extended leaves of absence from it. That Blueberry has always remained his primary source of income, allowing him to fully indulge in his artistic endeavors as Mœbius, was admitted as such by Giraud as early as 1979: "If an album of Moebius is released, about 10,000 people are interested. A Blueberry album sells at least 100,000 copies [in France]," and as late as 2005, "Blueberry is in some ways the 'sponsor' of Moebius, for years now."

Science fiction and fantasy comics
The "Mœbius" pseudonym, which Giraud came to use for his science fiction and fantasy work, was born in 1963, while he was working on the Hachette project, as he did not like "to work on paintings alone all day", and "like an alcoholic needing his alcohol" had to create comics. In a satire magazine called Hara-Kiri, Giraud used the name for 21 strips in 1963–64 (much of which collected in Epic's "Mœbius ½" – see below). Though Giraud enjoyed the artistic freedom and atmosphere at the magazine greatly, he eventually gave up his work there as Blueberry, on which he had embarked in the meantime, demanded too much of his energy, aside from being a better paid job. Magazine editor-in-chief Cavanna was loath to let Giraud go, not understanding why Giraud would want to waste his talents on a "kiddy comic". Subsequently, the pseudonym went unused for a decade, that is for comics at least, as Giraud continued its use for side-projects as illustrator. In the late 1960s-early 1970s, Giraud provided interior front, and back flyleaf illustrations as Mœbius for several outings in the science fiction book club series , a limited edition hardcover series, collecting work from seminal science fiction writers, from French publisher , continuing to do so throughout the 1970s with several additional covers for the publisher's Fiction (the magazine that introduced Giraud to science fiction at age 16) and  science fiction magazine and pocket book series. Additionally, this period in time also saw four vinyl record music productions endowed with Mœbius sleeve art. Much of this illustration art has been reproduced in Giraud's first art book as Mœbius, aptly entitled "Mœbius", released in 1980."Moebius" (146 pages, Paris:Les Humanoïdes Associés, January 1980), Bedetheque.com  There actually had also been a personal reason as well for Giraud to suspend his career as Mœbius comic artist; after he had returned from his second trip from Mexico, he found himself confronted with the artist's version of a writer's block as far as Mœbius comics were concerned, partly because Blueberry consumed all his energy. "For eight months I tried, but I could not do it, so I quit", stated Giraud additionally. Giraud's statement notwithstanding though, he did a couple of Hara-Kiriesque satirical comic shorts for Pilote in the early 1970s, but under the pseudonym "Gir", most of which reprinted in the comic book Gir œuvres: "Tome 1, Le lac des émeraudes", also collecting shorts he had created for the Fleurus magazines, Bonux-Boy, and the late-1960s TOTAL Journal magazine.

L'Écho des savanes (1974)
In 1974 he truly revived the Mœbius pseudonym for comics, and the very first, 12-page, story he created as such – while on one of his stopovers from America when the Dune production was in a lull – was "Cauchemar Blanc" ("White Nightmare"), published in the magazine L'Écho des savanes, issue 8, 1974. The black & white story dealt with the racist murder of an immigrant of North-African descent, and stands out as one of the very few emphatic socially engaged works of Giraud. Bearing in mind Giraud's fascination with the Western genre in general and the cultural aspects of Native-Americans in particular – and whose plight Giraud had always been sympathetic to – it is hardly a surprise that two later examples of such rare works were Native-American themed. These concerned the 2-page short story "Wounded Knee", inspired by the eponymous 1973 incident staged by Oglala Lakota, and the 3-page short story "Discours du Chef Seattle", first published in the artbook "Made in L.A." ("The Words of Chief Seattle", in Epic's "Ballad for a Coffin"). Giraud suddenly bursting out onto the comic scene as "Mœbius", caught European readership by surprise, and it took many of them, especially outside France, a couple of years before the realization had sunk in that "Jean Gir[raud]" and "Mœbius" were, physically at least, one and the same artist.

It was when he was brainstorming with the founding editors of the magazine (founded by former Pilote friends and co-artists in the wake of the revolt at the publisher, when they decided to strike out on their own), that Giraud came up with his first major Mœbius work, "Le bandard fou" ("The Horny Goof"). Released directly as album (a first for Mœbius comics) in black & white by the magazine's publisher, the humorous and satirical story dealt with a law-abiding citizen of the planet Souldaï, who awakens one day, only to find himself with a permanent erection. Pursued through space and time by his own puritanical authorities, who frown upon the condition, and other parties, who have their own intentions with the hapless bandard, he eventually finds a safe haven on the asteroid Fleur of Madame Kowalsky, after several hilarious adventures. When discounting the as "Gir" signed "La déviation", it is in this story that Giraud's signature, minute "Mœbius" art style, for which he became famed not that much later, truly comes into its own. Another novelty introduced in the book, is that the narrative is only related on the right-hand pages; the left-hand pages are taken up by one-page panels depicting an entirely unrelated cinematographic sequence of a man transforming after he has snapped his fingers. The story did raise some eyebrows with critics accusing Giraud of pornography at the time, but one reviewer put it in perspective when stating, "Peut-être Porno, mais Graphique!", which loosely translates as "Porn maybe, but Graphic Art for sure!". In the editorial of the 1990 American edition, Giraud has conceded that he was envious of what his former Pilote colleagues had achieved with L'Écho des savanes in regard to creating a free, creative environment for their artists, he had already enjoyed so much back at Hara-Kiri, and that it was an inspiration for the endeavor, Giraud embarked upon next.

Métal Hurlant (1974–1982)

Later that year, after Dune was permanently canceled with him definitively returning to France, Giraud became one of the founding members of the comics art group and publishing house "Les Humanoïdes Associés", together with fellow comic artists Jean-Pierre Dionnet, Philippe Druillet (likewise Pilote colleagues) and (outsider) financial director Bernard Farkas. In imitation of the example set by the L'Écho des savanes founding editors, it was therefore as such also an indirect result of the revolt these artists had previously staged at Pilote, and whose employ they had left for the undertaking. Together they started the monthly magazine Métal hurlant ("Screaming metal") in December 1974, and for which he had temporarily abandoned his Blueberry series. The translated version was known in the English-speaking world as Heavy Metal, and started its release in April 1977, actually introducing Giraud's work to North-American readership. Mœbius' famous serial "The Airtight Garage" and his groundbreaking "Arzach" both began in Métal hurlant. Unlike Hara-Kiri and L'Écho des savanes though, whose appeal has always remained somewhat limited to the socially engaged satire and underground comic scenes, it was Métal hurlant in particular that revolutionized the world of Franco-Belgian bandes dessinées, whereas its American cousin left an indelible impression on a generation of not only American comic artists, but on film makers as well, as evidenced below.

Starting its publication in the first issue of Métal hurlant, "Arzach" is a wordless 1974–1975 comic, executed directly in color and created as a conscious attempt to breathe new life into the comic genre which at the time was dominated by American superhero comics in the United States, and by the traditional, adolescent oriented bandes dessinée in Europe. It tracks the journey of the title character flying on the back of his pterodactyl through a fantastic world mixing medieval fantasy with futurism. Unlike most science fiction comics, it is, save for the artfully executed story titles, entirely devoid of captions, speech balloons and written sound effects. It has been argued that the wordlessness provides the strip with a sense of timelessness, setting up Arzach's journey as a quest for eternal, universal truths. The short stories "L'Homme est-il bon?" ("Is Man Good?", in issue 10, 1976, after the first publication in Pilote, issue 744, 1974, which however woke Giraud up to the "unbearable realization" that he was "enriching" the publisher with his Mœbius work, thereby expediting his departure.), "Ballade" ("The Ballade", 1977 and inspired by the poem "Fleur" by French poet Arthur Rimbaud), "Ktulu" (issue 33bis, 1978, an H. P. Lovecraft-inspired story) and "Citadelle aveugle" ("The White Castle", in issue 51, 1980 and oddly enough signed as "Gir") were examples of additional stories Giraud created directly in color, shortly after "Arzach". 1976 saw the Métal hurlant, issues 7–8, publication of "The Long Tomorrow", written by Dan O'Bannon in 1974 during lulls in the pre-production of Jodorowsky's Dune.

His series The Airtight Garage, starting its magazine run in issue 6, 1976, is particularly notable for its non-linear plot, where movement and temporality can be traced in multiple directions depending on the readers' own interpretation even within a single planche (page or picture). The series tells of Major Grubert, who is constructing his own multi-level universe on an asteroid named Fleur (from the "Bandard fou" universe incidentally, and the first known instance of the artist's attempts of tying all his "Mœbius" creations into one coherent Airtight Garage universe), where he encounters a wealth of fantastic characters including Michael Moorcock's creation Jerry Cornelius.

1978 marked the publication of the 54-page "Les yeux du chat" ("Eyes of the Cat"). The dark, disturbing and surreal tale dealt with a blind boy in a non-descript empty cityscape, who has his pet eagle scout for eyes, which it finds by taking these from a street cat and offering them to his awaiting companion who, while grateful, expresses his preference for the eyes of a child. The story premise originated from a brainstorming session Alejandro Jodorowsky had with his fellows of the Académie Panique, a group concentrated on chaotic and surreal performance art, as a response to surrealism becoming mainstream. Jodorowsky worked out the story premise as a therapy to alleviate the depression he was in after the failure of his Dune project and presented the script to Giraud in 1977 during a visit to Paris. Deeming the story too short for a regular, traditional comic, it was Giraud who suggested the story to be told on the format he had already introduced in "Le bandard fou", to wit, as single panel pages. On recommendation of Jodorowsky, he refined the format by relating the eagle's quest on the right-hand pages, while depicting the awaiting boy in smaller single panel left-hand pages from a contra point-of-view. Giraud furthermore greatly increased his already high level of detail by making extensive use of zipatone for the first time. Considered a key and seminal work, both for its art and storytelling, setting Jodorowsky off on his career as comic writer, the art evoked memories of the wood engravings from the 19th century, including those of Gustave Doré, that Giraud discovered and admired in the books of his grandparents when he was living there in his childhood. However, it—like "La déviation"—has remained somewhat of a one-shot in Giraud's body of work in its utilization of such a high level of detail. The story, printed on yellow paper to accentuate the black & white art, was originally published directly as a, to 5000 copies limited book edition, gift item for relations of the publisher. It was only after expensive pirate editions started to appear that the publisher decided to make the work available commercially on a wider scale, starting in 1981."Les yeux du chat", stripINFO.be , includes other language editions. Jodorowsky had intended the work to be the first of a trilogy, but that never came to fruition.

In a certain way "Les yeux du chat" concluded a phase that had started with "La Déviation", and this viewpoint was adhered to by the publisher who had coined the era "Les années Métal Hurlant" on one of its latter-day anthologies. The very first "Mœbius" anthology collection the publisher released as such, was the 1980–1985 Moebius œuvres complètes six-volume collection of which two, volumes 4, "La Complainte de l'Homme Programme" and 5, "Le Désintégré Réintégré" (the two of them in essence comprising an expanded version of the 1980 original), were Mœbius art books. It also concluded a phase in which Giraud was preoccupied in a "characteristic period in his life" in which he was "very somber and pessimistic about my life", resulting in several of his "Mœbius" stories of that period ending in death and destruction. These included the poetic "Ballade", in which Giraud killed off the two protagonists, something he came to regret a decade later in this particular case.

In the magazine's issue 58 of 1980 Giraud started his famous L'Incal series in his third collaboration with Jodorowsky. However, by this time Giraud felt that his break-out success as "Mœbius" had come at a cost. He had left Pilote to escape the pressure and stifling conditions he was forced to work under, seeking complete creative freedom, but now it was increasingly becoming "as stifling as it had been before with Blueberry", as he conceded in 1982, adding philosophically, "The more you free yourself, the more powerless you become!". How deeply ingrained this sentiment was, was evidenced in a short interview in Métal Hurlant, issue 82, later that year, where an overworked Giraud stated, "I will finish the Blueberry series, I will finish the John Difool [Incal] series and then I'm done. Then I will quit comics!" At the time he had just finished working as storyboard, and production design artist on the Movie Tron, something he had enjoyed immensely. Fortunately for his fans, Giraud did not act upon his impulse as history has shown, though he did take action to escape the hectic Parisian comic scene in 1980 by moving himself and his family as far away from Paris as possible in France, and relocated to the small city of Pau at the foothills of the Pyrenees. It was while he was residing in Pau that Giraud started to take an interest in the teachings of Jean-Paul Appel-Guéry, becoming an active member of his group and partaking in their gatherings.

Tahiti (1983–1984)
From 1985 to 2001 he also created his six-volume fantasy series Le Monde d'Edena, which has appeared in English as The Aedena Cycle. The stories were strongly influenced by the teachings of Jean-Paul Appel-Guéry, and Guy-Claude Burger's instinctotherapy. In effect, Giraud and his family did join Appel-Guéry's commune on Tahiti in 1983, until late 1984, when the family moved to the United States, where Giraud set up shop first in Santa Monica, and subsequently in Venice and Woodland Hills, California. Giraud's one-shot comic book "La nuit de l'étoile" was co-written by Appel-Guéry, and has been the most visible manifestation of Giraud's stay on Tahiti, aside from the artbooks "La memoire du futur" and "Venise celeste". Concurrently collaborating on "La nuit de l'étoile" was young artist Marc Bati, also residing at the commune at the time, and for whom Giraud afterwards wrote the comic series Altor (The Magic Crystal), while in the US. It was under the influence of Appel-Guéry's teachings that Giraud conceived a third pseudonym, Jean Gir – formally introduced to the public as "Jean Gir, Le Nouveau Mœbius" in "Venise celeste" (p. 33), though Giraud had by the time of publication already dispensed with the pseudonym himself – which appeared on the art he created while on Tahiti, though not using it for his Aedena Cycle. Another member of the commune was Paula Salomon, for whom Giraud had already illustrated her 1980 book "La parapsychologie et vous". Having to move stateside for work served Giraud well, as he became increasingly disenchanted at a later stage with the way Appel-Guéry ran his commune on Tahiti, in the process dispensing with his short-lived third pseudonym. His stay at the commune though, had practical implications on his personal life; Giraud gave up eating meat, smoking, coffee, alcohol and, for the time being, the use of mind-expanding substances, adhering to his newfound abstinence for the most part for the remainder of his life.

Both men had already released the very first such art book in the Humanoïdes days, and the format then conceived – to wit, a large 30x30cm book format at first, with art organized around themes, introduced by philosophical poetry by Mœbius – was adhered to for later such releases, including "La memoire du futur".

Marvel Comics (1984–1989)

After having arrived in California, Giraud's wife Claudine set up Giraud's third publishing house Starwatcher Graphics in 1985, essentially the US branch of Gentiane/Aedena with the same goals, resulting in the release of, among others, the extremely limited art portfolio La Cité de Feu, a collaborative art project of Giraud with Geoff Darrow (see below). However, due to their unfamiliarity with the American publishing world, the company did not do well, and in an effort to remedy the situation Claudine hired the French/American editor couple Jean-Marc and Randy Lofficier, whom she had met at the summer 1985 San Diego ComicCon, as editors-in-chief for Starwatcher, also becoming shareholders in the company. Already veterans of the US publishing world (and Mœbius fans), it was the Lofficier couple that managed to convince editor-in-chief Archie Goodwin of Marvel Comics to publish most of Moebius' hitherto produced work on a wider scale in the US—in contrast with the Heavy Metal niche market releases by HM Communications in the late 1970s—in graphic novel format trade editions, under its Epic imprint from 1987 to 1994. These incidentally, included three of Mœbius' latter-day art books, as well as the majority of his Blueberry Western comic.

It was for the Marvel/Epic publication effort that it was decided to dispense with the "Jean [Gir]aud"/"Mœbius" dichotomy—until then strictly adhered-to by the artist—as both the artist's given name and his Blueberry creation were all but unknown in the English speaking world. This was contrary to his reputation as "Mœbius", already acquired in the Heavy Metal days, and from then on used for all his work in the English speaking world (and Japan), though the dichotomy remained elsewhere, including native France.

A two-issue Silver Surfer miniseries (later collected as Silver Surfer: Parable), written by Stan Lee and drawn by Giraud (as Mœbius), was published through Marvel's Epic Comics imprint in 1988 and 1989. According to Giraud, this was his first time working under the Marvel method instead of from a full script, and he has admitted to being baffled by the fact that he already had a complete story synopsis on his desk only two days after he had met Stan Lee for the first time, having discussed what Giraud had assumed was a mere proposition over lunch. This miniseries won the Eisner Award for best finite/limited series in 1989. Mœbius' version was discussed in the 1995 submarine thriller Crimson Tide by two sailors pitting his version against those of Jack Kirby, with the main character played by Denzel Washington, emphasizing the Kirby one being the better of the two. Becoming aware of the reference around 1997, Giraud was later told around 2005 by the movie's director Tony Scott, that it was he who had written in the dialog as an homage to the artist on behalf of his brother Ridley, a Mœbius admirer, and not (uncredited) script doctor Quentin Tarentino (known for infusing his works with pop culture references) as he was previously led to believe. An amused Giraud quipped, "It's better than a big stature, because in a way, I can not dream of anything better to be immortal [than] being in a movie about submarines!"

As a result, from his cooperation with Marvel, Giraud delved deeper into the American superhero mythology and created superhero art stemming from both Marvel and DC Comics, which were sold as art prints, posters or included in calendars. Even as late as 1997, Giraud had created cover art for two DC comic book outings, Hardware (Vol. 1, issue 49, March 1997) and Static (Vol. 1, issue 45, March 1997), after an earlier cover for Marvel Tales (Vol. 2, issue 253, September 1991). Another project Giraud embarked upon in his "American period", was for a venture into that other staple of American pop culture, trading cards. Trading card company Comic Images released a "Mœbius Collector Cards" set in 1993, featuring characters and imagery from all over his Mœbius universe, though his Western work was excluded. None of the images were lifted from already existing work, but were especially created by Giraud the year previously.

Although Giraud had taken up residence in California for five years – holding a temporary residence (the O-1 "Extraordinary Ability" category, including the "International Artist" status) visa – he maintained a transient lifestyle, as his work had him frequently travel to Belgium and native France (maintaining a home in Paris), as well as to Japan, for extended periods of time. His stay in the United States was an inspiration for his aptly called Made in L.A. art book, and much of his art he had produced in this period of time, including his super hero art, was reproduced in this, and the follow-up art book Fusions, the latter of which having seen a translation in English by Epic.

Giraud's extended stay in the US, garnered him a 1986 Inkpot Award, an additional 1991 Eisner Award, as well as three Harvey Awards in the period 1988–1991 for the various graphic novel releases by Marvel. It was in this period that Giraud, who had already picked up Spanish as a second language as a result from his various trips to Mexico and his dealings with Jodorowsky and his retinue, also picked up sufficient language skills to communicate in English.

Later work (1990–2012)
In late summer 1989, Giraud returned to France, definitively as it turned out, though that was initially not his intent. His family had already returned to France earlier, as his children wanted to start their college education in their native county and wife Claudine had accompanied them to set up home in Paris. However, it also turned out that his transient lifestyle had taken its toll on the marriage, causing the couple to drift apart, and it was decided upon his return to enter into a "living apart together" relationship, which allowed for an "enormous freedom and sincerity" without "demands and frustrations" for both spouses, according to the artist. Additionally, Giraud had met Isabelle Champeval during a book signing in Venice, Italy in February 1984, and entered into a relationship with her in 1987, which resulted in the birth of second son Raphaël in 1989. Giraud's marriage with Claudine was legally ended in December 1994, without much drama according to Giraud, as both spouses had realized that "each wanted something different out of life". Exemplary of the marriage ending without any ill will was, that Claudine was still emphatically acknowledged for her contributions in the 1997 artbook "Blueberry's", and the documentary made for the occasion of its release. Giraud and Isabelle were married on 13 May 1995, and the union resulted in their second child, daughter Nausicaa, the same year. For Giraud his second marriage was of such great personal importance, that he henceforth considered his life divided in a pre-Isabelle part and a post-Isabelle part, having coined his second wife "the key to the whole grand design". Isabelle's sister and Giraud's sister-in-law, Claire, became a regular contributor as colorist on Giraud's latter-day work.

The changes in his personal life were also accompanied with changes in his business holdings during 1988–1990. His co-founded publishing house Gentiane/Aedena went into receivership in 1988, going bankrupt a short time thereafter. The American subsidiary Starwatcher Graphics followed in its wake around the turn of the millennium, partly because it was a shared marital possession of the original Giraud couple and partly because the publication efforts of his work in the United States had run its course. In 1989 Giraud sold his shares in Les Humanoïdes Associés to Fabrice Giger, thereby formally severing his ownership ties with the publisher, which however remained the regular publisher of his Mœbius work from the Métal hurlant era, including L'Incal. Together with Claudine he founded Stardom in 1990, his first true family operated business without any outside participation, according to Giraud, with the 1525-copy limited mini art portfolio "Mockba - carnet de bord" becoming the company's first recorded publication in September the same year. Apart from being a publishing house, it was concurrently an art gallery, located on 27 Rue Falguière, 75015 Paris, organizing themed exhibitions on a regular basis. In 1997, the company was renamed Moebius Production – singular, despite the occasional and erroneous use of the plural, even by the company itself. The company, in both publishing and art gallery iterations, is as of 2023 still being run by Isabelle Giraud who had taken over the function of publishing editor and co-ownership from Claudine (explaining the renaming of the company), after the latter's marriage with Giraud was dissolved in 1994, and her sister Claire.

The first thing Giraud did creatively upon his return was to finish up on the Blueberry album "Arizona Love" on his own after his longtime writing partner Jean-Michel Charlier had died on 10 July 1989. Due to his intimate twenty-five year familiarity with both the series and its writer, it was a foregone conclusion that Giraud would from then on take on the scripting of the main Blueberry series as well, especially since it was already agreed upon in the "contracts signed with Jean-Michel" that "the survivor would take over the series". Stunned by the sudden death of his longtime co-worker though, he could not bring himself to work on the art for Blueberry afterwards for nearly five years before he embarked on Blueberry again as artist. Giraud stated that the series had lost its "father", and that the "mother needed time to mourn". Nonetheless, he did embark on the Marshal Blueberry spin-off series in 1990 as writer (leaving the artwork firstly to William Vance and subsequently to ), wanting to pay homage to the legacy of his late writing partner by creating a story in his spirit, or as Giraud had put it, "{A]nd [I] said to myself: Well, I'm going to see if I'm able to write a story à la Charlier. So I wrote this scenario, not too bad, but quite traditional, quite classic." In similar vein, Giraud took up the writing for the other Charlier/Giraud western creation, Jim Cutlass, that Charlier had actually been in the process of revitalizing in the year before his death, and for which he had already contracted  for the artwork, besides having already started on the scenario. After having added six more volumes to the once one-shot series, the series – which he, as explained above, had published at publisher Casterman instead of (western) house-publisher Dargud – folded in 1999 due to the fact that it was not nearly as commercially successful as Blueberry had been.

Under his "Mœbius" pseudonym, Giraud concurrently continued to work on The Aedena Cycle and the Madwoman of the Sacred Heart trilogy, both of which started in the US and completed in 2001 and 1998 respectively, after which he concentrated on Blueberrys "OK Corral" cycle, started in 1994 upon his return to France. While Giraud was in the midst of "OK Corral" cycle, he also embarked on a new sequel cycle of his acclaimed Incal main series, called Après l'Incal (After the Incal). Yet, after he had penciled the first outing in the series, "Le nouveau rêve", he found himself confronted with "too many things that attract me, too many desires in all the senses", causing him to be no longer able to "devote myself to the bande dessinée as befitting a professional in the traditional sense". Despite repeated pleas to convince Giraud otherwise, it left writer Jodorowsky with no other recourse than to start anew with a new artist. This insight had repercussions though, as Giraud, after he had finished the "OK Corral" cycle in 2005, no longer continued to produce comics and/or art on a commercial base, but rather on a project and/or personal base, usually under the aegis of his own publishing house Mœbius Production.

As Mœbius Production, Giraud published from 2000 to 2010 Inside Mœbius (French text despite English title), an illustrated autobiographical fantasy in six hardcover volumes totaling 700 pages. Pirandello-like, he appears in cartoon form as both creator and protagonist trapped within the story alongside his younger self and several longtime characters such as Blueberry, Arzak (the latest re-spelling of the Arzach character's name), Major Grubert (from The Airtight Garage) and others.

Jean Giraud drew the first of the two-part volume of the XIII series titled "La Version Irlandaise" ("The Irish Version") from a script by Jean Van Hamme, to accompany the second part by the regular team Jean Van Hamme–William Vance, "Le dernier round" ("The Last Round"). Both parts were published on the same date (13 November 2007) and were the last ones written by Van Hamme before Yves Sente took over the series. The contribution was also a professional courtesy to the series' artist, Vance, who had previously provided the artwork for the first two titles in the by Giraud written Marshall Blueberry spin-off series.

Late in life, Giraud also decided to revive his seminal Arzak character in an elaborate new adventure series; the first (and last in hindsight) volume of a planned trilogy, Arzak l'arpenteur, appeared in 2010. He also added to the Airtight Garage series with two volumes entitled "Le chasseur déprime" (2008) and "Major" (2011), as well as the art book "La faune de Mars" (2011), the latter two initially released in a limited, 1000 copy French only, print run by Mœbius Production. By this time, Giraud created his comic art on a specialized graphic computer tablet, as its enlargement features had become an indispensable aid, because of his failing eyesight.

Creating comics became increasingly difficult for Giraud, as his eyesight started to fail him in his last years, having undergone severe surgery in 2010 to stave off blindness in his left eye, and it was mainly for this reason that Giraud increasingly concentrated on creating single-piece art, both as "Gir" and as "Mœbius", on larger canvases on either commission basis or under the aegis of Mœbius Production. Much of the latter artwork was from 2005 onward, alongside older original art Giraud still had in his possession, sold by the company for considerable prices in specialized comic auctions at such auction houses like Artcurial, Hôtel Drouot and Millon & Associés.

Illustrator and author
As already indicated above, Giraud had throughout his entire career made illustrations for books, magazines, music productions (though playing the piano and electric guitar, Giraud was, unlike his second son Raphaël, regrettably not a creative musician himself by his own admission, but did have a lifelong fascination with jazz), but also promotional art for commercial institutions such as banks and corporations. A notable early example of the latter, concerned the Blueberry art he created in 1978 for the Spanish jeans manufacturer Lois Jeans & Jackets; Aside from being traditionally run as an advertisement in numerous magazines, it was also blown up to gigantic, mural-like dimensions and as posters plastered on walls and billboards in several places all around Paris. As book illustrator, Giraud illustrated for example the 1987 first edition of the science fiction novel Project Pendulum by Robert Silverberg, and the 1994 French edition of the novel The Alchemist by Paulo Coelho. The subsequent year Giraud followed up in the same vein as the Coelho novel, with his cover and interior illustrations for a French 1995 reprint of "Ballades" from the French medieval poet François Villon. Much of this non-comic art, including the one for Lois has been reproduced in the artbooks that were released over the years.

Giraud was in mid-1990s approached by two video game developers to provide the box cover art for the video games that were released in 1995; the first one concerned the Fade to Black video game developed by the US Delphine Software International, whereas the second one concerned Panzer Dragoon video game developed by the Japanese Sega Corporation. And while Giraud was by now the well established Mœbius artist in both countries, he was only asked to contribute the box cover art for the two video game releases, and nothing beyond. A few years later though, he was also asked to contribute to later games as a concept artist.

In 1999, Giraud's illustrations appeared in a soft cover edition of Dante Alighieri's La Divina Commedia, published by the Nuages Gallery in Milan. As "Mœbius" he illustrated the Paradiso volume, while the two others, Inferno and Purgatorio, were illustrated by Lorenzo Mattotti and Milton Glaser respectively. The edition was published under the Mœbius name. Giraud's illustrations for Paradiso take heavy inspiration from the engravings of the Divine Comedy by Gustave Doré, with compositions often approaching an exact match. Giraud acknowledged this influence directly, praising Doré's work and remarking how he sometimes literally used tracing paper to sketch compositions. Though another prominent example of Giraud's non-comic book work, the influences from his science fiction and fantasy comics shine through. The illustrations, with vivid colors and space-age headresses, are distinctly rendered in the Mœbius mode.

An out-of-the-ordinary latter-day contribution as such, constituted his illustrations as "Mœbius" for the Thursday 6 March 2008 issue of the Belgian newspaper Le Soir. His illustrations accompanied news articles throughout the newspaper, providing a Mœbiusienne look on events. In return, the newspaper, for the occasion entitled "Le Soir par (by) Mœbius", featured two half-page editorials on the artist (pp. 20 & 37).

Under the names Giraud, Gir and Mœbius, he also wrote several comics for other comic artists as listed below, and the early ones included Jacques Tardi and Claude Auclair. Aside from writing for other comic artists, he also wrote story outlines for the movies Les Maîtres du temps, Internal Transfer, Little Nemo: Adventures in Slumberland and  Thru the Moebius Strip as outlined further down the line.

As author on personal title, Giraud has – apart from his own bande dessinée scripts – written philosophical poetry that accompanied his art in his Mœbius artbooks of the 1980s and 1990s. He also wrote the "Story Notes" editorials for the American Epic publications, providing background information on his work contained therein. In 1998, he took time off to write his autobiography, Moebius-Giraud: Histoire de mon double.

Films

Giraud's friend Jean-Claude Mézières has divulged in the 1970s that their very first outing into the world of cinema concerned a 1957 animated Western, unsurprisingly considering their shared passion for the genre, "Giraud, with his newfound prestige because of his trip to Mexico [note: Mézières had wanted to accompany his friend to Mexico, but was not able to raise the money], started a pro career at Cœurs Valiants, but together with two other friends we tackled a very ambitious project first: a cartoon western for which Giraud drew the sets and the main characters. Alas, rather disappointingly, we had to stop after only 45 seconds!" Any further movie aspirations Giraud, who himself had considered the effort "too laborious", might have had entertained had to wait until he received the 1974 invitation of Alejandro Jodorowsky to work on his planned adaptation of Frank Herbert's Dune, which was however abandoned in pre-production. Jodorowsky's Dune, a 2013 American-French documentary directed by Frank Pavich, explores Jodorowsky's unsuccessful attempt. Giraud, a non-English speaker at the time, later admitted that the prospect of moving over to Los Angeles filled him with trepidation, initially causing him to procrastinate. It was friend Philippe Druillet (with whom he would co-found Les Humanoïdes Associés later that year) who pushed him to up and go, which he did by going AWOL again from his job at Pilote. Giraud was grateful for Druillet pushing him as he found that he reveled in his first Hollywood experience. In the end the project took nine months before it fell apart, but Giraud's presence was not always required, giving him ample time to return to France on several occasions, to pursue his other work, such as his work for L'Écho des savanes and, most importantly, to firstly finish up on Blueberrys "Angel Face", which he ultimately did in record time, this time formally quitting Pilote afterwards.

Despite Jodowowsky's project falling through, it had attracted the attention of other movie makers. One of them was Ridley Scott who managed to reassemble a large part of Jodorowsky's original creative team, including Giraud, for his 1979 science fiction thriller Alien. Hired as a concept artist, Giraud's stay on the movie lasted only a few days, as he had obligations elsewhere. Nonetheless, his designs for the Nostromo crew attire, and their spacesuits in particular, were almost one-on-one adopted by Scott and appearing onscreen as designed, resulting in what Giraud had coined "two weeks of work and ten years of fallout in media and advertising". Scott did explicitly acknowledge "Mœbius" for his contributions in the special features for the movie in the Alien Quadrilogy home media collection. Scott was taken with Giraud's art, having cited "The Long Tomorrow" as an influence on his second major movie Blade Runner of 1982 (see below), and invited him again for both this, and his subsequent third major movie Legend of 1985, which Giraud had to decline in both cases for, again, obligations elsewhere. He especially regretted not having been able to work on the latter movie, having deemed it "very good", and it was still on his mind as late as 2010, as he directly referred to the movie when he made his "unicorn" statement regarding his legacy, quoted below.

1981 saw the release of the animated film Heavy Metal, produced by Ivan Reitman. The heavily "Arzach"-inspired last, "Taarna", section of the movie, has led to the persistent misconception, especially held in the United States, that Giraud had provided characters and situations for the segment, albeit uncredited. Giraud however, had already emphatically squashed that particular misconception himself on an early occasion, "I had absolutely nothing to do with it," stated the artist in 1982, "Sure, the people who made the movie were inspired by quite a few things from "Arzach"," further explaining that, while the American producers had indeed intended to use the artist's material from the eponymous magazine, there were legalities involved between the American and French mother magazines, because the latter had financial interests in Laloux's below mentioned Les Maîtres du temps that was concurrently in development, and in which Giraud was very much involved with. The American producers went ahead regardless of the agreements made between them and Métal hurlant. While not particularly pleased with the fact, Giraud was amused when third parties wanted to sue the Americans on his behalf. Giraud however, managed to convince his editor-in-chief Jean-Pierre Dionnet (one of his co-founding friends of Métal hurlant) to let the issue slide, as he found "all that fuss with lawyers" not worth his while, aside from the incongruous circumstance that the French magazine was running advertisements for the American movie.

Still, Alien led to two other movie assignments in 1982, this time as both concept and storyboard artist. The first one concerned the Disney science fiction movie Tron, whose director Steven Lisberger specifically requested Giraud, after he had discovered his work in Heavy Metal magazine. The second assignment concerned Giraud's collaboration with director René Laloux to create the science fiction feature-length animated movie Les Maîtres du temps (released in English as Time Masters) based on a novel by Stefan Wul. He and director Rene Laloux shared the award for Best Children's Film at the Fantafestival that year. For the latter, Giraud was also responsible for the poster art and the comic adaption of the same title, with some of his concept and storyboard art featured in a "making-of" book to boot. Excepting Les Maîtres du temps, Giraud's movie work had him travel to Los Angeles for longer periods of time.

Outside his actual involvement with motion pictures, Giraud was in this period of time also occasionally commissioned to create poster art for, predominantly European, movies. Movies for which Giraud, also as "Mœbius", created poster art included, Touche pas à la femme blanche !

As his two 1982 movies coincided with the end of his Métal hurlant days and his departure for Tahiti shortly thereafter, this era can be seen as Giraud's "first Hollywood period", especially since the next project he embarked on entailed a movie in which he was very much invested as initiator, writer and producer as well, contrary to the movies he hitherto had worked upon as a gun-for-hire.

While Giraud was residing in Appel-Guéry's commune, he, together with Appel-Guéry and another member of the commune, Paula Salomon, came up with a story premise for a major animated science fiction movie called Internal Transfer, which was endowed with the English title Starwatcher – after which Giraud's American publishing house was named. Slated for the production was Arnie Wong, whom Giraud had met during the production of Tron (and, incidentally, one of the animators of the vaunted "Taarna" segment of the Heavy Metal movie), and it was actually Disney whom Giraud offered the production first. Disney, at the time not believing in the viability of such a production in animation, declined. Another member of the commune fronted some of the money for the project to proceed, and the production was moved to Wong's animation studio in Los Angeles. It was this circumstance that provided Giraud with his alibi to leave Appel-Guéry's commune and settle in California – and the reason why he had to decline Ridley Scott for his Legend movie. Much to Giraud's disappointment and frustration though, the project eventually fell apart for several extraneous reasons, most notably for lack of funding, as related above by the artist. Still, the concept art he provided for the project served as the basis for his first collaboration with Geof Darrow, whom he had also met previously on the production of Tron, on their 1985 City of Fire art portfolio. Some of the concept art was reprinted in the art book "Made in L.A.".

Yet, despite this failure to launch, it did lead to his, what can be considered, "second Hollywood period" in his "American period". Concurrent with his career as a comic artist in the United States, invitations followed to participate as concept artist on Masters of the Universe (1987), Willow (1988), The Abyss (1989), and finally Yutaka Fujioka's Japanese animated feature film Little Nemo: Adventures in Slumberland (1989), for which he was not only the conceptual designer, but also the story writer. It was for this movie that Giraud resided in Japan for an extended period of time.

His definitive return to France in 1989 marked the beginning of Giraud's third and last movie period. In January 1992, the French newspaper Le Monde reported on a computer animated movie that was under development at the company Vidéosystem. It actually concerned a second attempt to get Starwatcher on the silver screen, but just like its 1984 predecessor, it eventually failed to come to fruition. Afterwards, Giraud made original character designs and did visual development for Warner Bros.' partly animated 1996 movie Space Jam. 1997 saw his participation as concept artist on Luc Besson's science fiction epic The Fifth Element, which was of great personal importance for Giraud as it meant working together with his lifelong friend Jean-Claude Mézières, coming full circle after their very first aborted 1957 attempt at creating a motion picture. The 2005 documentary made for this occasion was testament to the great friendship both men had for each other. Concurrently, Giraud's oldest child, daughter Hélène, was employed on the movie in a similar function, albeit uncredited, though Giraud had stated with fatherly pride, "Yes, she had cooperated in a truly engaged manner. She started at the crack of dawn, and only went home in the evening, after the whole team had stopped working." Giraud's experience on the movie was however somewhat marred by the 2004 lawsuit publisher Les Humanoïdes Associés (ostensibly on his behalf like the earlier 1981 intent which Giraud had then successfully prevented) and Alejandro Jodorowsky leveled against Besson for alleged plagiarism of L'Incal, a lawsuit they lost.

2005 saw the release of the Chinese movie Thru the Moebius Strip, based on a story by Giraud who also served as the production designer and the co-producer, and which reunited him with Arnie Wong, whereas his stint as concept designer on the 2012 animated science fiction movie Strange Frame, has become Giraud's final recorded motion picture contribution.

Movie adaptations
In 1991 his graphic novel short, "Cauchemar Blanc", was cinematized by Mathieu Kassovitz, winning Kassovitz (but not Giraud) two film awards. With , Giraud saw his ambitions as a full-fledged animation movie maker at least in part fulfilled. A 2002 series for French television broadcaster France 2, it consisted of fourteen four minute long animated vignettes, based on Giraud's seminal character, for which he did the writing, drawings and co-production. Young daughter Nausicaa had voice-over appearances in three of the episodes together with her father.

"The Lost Dutchman's Mine" story cycle of the Blueberry series was adapted for the screen in 2004, by Jan Kounen, as Blueberry: L'expérience secrète. Three prior attempts to bring Blueberry to the silver screen had fallen through two decades earlier; in 1986 Charlier disclosed how American actor Martin Kove had actually already been signed to play the titular role – with whom Kove shared a remarkable resemblance at the time – for the first two early-1980s attempts, which were both based on the "Confederate Gold" cycle. It was Kove who introduced the two Blueberry creators to would-be American film producers on both occasions. The first attempt failed because American producers intended a complete script rewrite turning Blueberry into a completely unrecognizable standard western. The second attempt suffered even worse as its American producer, "inspired" by the success of the 1981 movie Raiders of the Lost Ark, wanted to turn the project into a Raiders 2.0, set in the Yucatán peninsula, complete with Aztec warriors and pyramids and featuring a daring escape in a zeppelin-type airship. Helped by his background in law, an aghast Charlier instructed Giraud to sabotage the project as much as possible and the  Blueberry creators eventually managed to buy back the rights for US$30.000. Already mentioned by Charlier in his 1986 interview, Kove had even traveled to Europe to shoot some test-footage scenes from the comic series in this role in order to entice potential investors, and that some of it was still in his possession as it turned out decades later. Convinced that the project was a viable one, Kove has also revealed in 2014 that he, together with the two Blueberry creators, tried to save it by putting up his own money as well when the project was falling apart due to arguments about funding among European/American would-be producers – to no avail however, which was a slightly different version of events as had been related by Charlier. The third (and last) attempt concerned a European only endeavor, which had at one point actually involved Sergio Leone, according to Charlier, and was actually conceived as a television movie series and slated to be produced by the Swiss/French/Belgian production/distribution company Technisonor, more faithfully adhering – than the later 2004 film adaptation – to the main comic series and intended to span the "Iron Horse" through the "Rehabilitation" story cycles. That 1983 attempt petered out without so much as a whimper, most likely due to lack of interest on the part of European investors.

2010 saw the adaptation of "La planète encore" ("The Still Planet"), a short story from the Le Monde d'Edena universe – and which had won him his 1991 Eisner Award – into an animated short. Moebius Production served as a production company, with Isabelle Giraud serving as one of its producers. Giraud himself was one of the two directors of the short and it premiered at the «Mœbius transe forme» exposition at the Fondation Cartier pour l'art contemporain in Paris.

In November 2021 it was announced Oscar winner Taika Waititi would direct the screen adaptation of Jodorowsky/Moebius's graphic novel The Incal and co-write the script with frequent collaborators Jemaine Clement and Peter Warren.

Video games

Two years after he had provided box cover art for two video games, Giraud was approached for more substantial video game contributions when developer Arxel Tribe asked Giraud to become a concept designer for their 1997 Pilgrim: Faith as a Weapon game they had in development. It actually reunited Giraud with Paulo Coelho on whose 1987 work The Pilgrimage the game was based and who also responsible for its adaptation, and for whom Giraud had illustrated his Alchemist French-edition novel three years earlier. As Mœbius, Giraud designed among others the costumes for the game.

Seven years later the Japanese 2004 video game Seven Samurai 20XX was released for which Giraud was asked to provide the character concept designs. This was his last known video game contribution.

Essentially, the work he had been asked to perform for these two video games, did not differ that much from the movie work Giraud had done since the 1979 movie Alien in a near-similar function.

Exhibitions

Part of the "many desires" that increasingly attracted Giraud later in life, steering him away from creating traditional bandes dessinées, was his personal fascination and involvement with the many exhibitions dedicated to his work, that started to proliferate from the mid-1990s onward not only in native France, but internationally as well, causing him to frequently travel abroad, among others to Japan, for extended periods of time, with the 2010 «Mœbius transe forme» exposition in Paris becoming the apotheosis.
 26 April-16 August 1995:«Mœbius: a retrospective» exposition at the Cartoon Art Museum, San Francisco, USA; came with limited edition catalog (see below)
 December 1995: «Wanted: Blueberry» exposition at the Arthaud Grenette mega-bookstore, Grenoble, France; also featuring original Blueberry art by Colin Wilson. Both he and Jean Giraud attended the opening on 1 December, making themselves also available for book signings. Prior to the opening a promotional brochure was disseminated by the bookstore ("Arthaud BD News", issue 1, November 1995), featuring a three-page interview with Giraud.
 19 September-9 October 1996: «Jean Giraud Blueberry» exposition at the Stardom Gallery, Paris, France, for the occasion of the upcoming release of the "Blueberry's" artbook by Stardom – Giraud's own publishing house/art gallery. The below-mentioned 1997 documentary was the registration of events surrounding the release, including the exhibition.
 August 1997: «Giraud/Mœbius» themed , France; co-produced with Stardom. A special festival guide, illustrated by Giraud – having received the festival's most prestigious comic award the previous year – and featuring a large interview with the artist, was published for the occasion by the festival organization.
 10 October–9 November 1997: «Mœbius: Infinito» grande exposition, Deposito ferroviario ai Lolli, Palermo, and on 7 February–29 March 1998, Palazzo Querini Stampalia, Venice, Italy; The softcover artbook "Mœbius: Infinito" published for the occasions
 29 November 1997 – 11 January 1998: «Mœbius: Visoni de fine mellennio» grande exposition, Milan, Italy; The softcover artbook "Moebius: Visoni de fine mellennio" published for the occasion
 December 1998-January 1990: Musée d'art contemporain de Lyon, France
 30 June-14 November 1999: «1 Monde Réel» exposition at Fondation Cartier, Paris, France
 26 January-3 September 2000: «Trait de Génie Giraud» exposition, Angoulême, France; The 48-page illustrated exhibition catalog "Trait de génie Giraud Moebius" published for the occasion. Enhanced with elaborate background information and an in-depth interview with the artist, the book edition was limited to 2000 copies.
 May–June 2000: Große Austellung, Erlangen, Germany
 May 2000: Collective exposition on contemporary comics at the Bibliothèque nationale de France, Paris, France
 October 2001: Grande exposition, Montrouge, France
 June 2003: Great exposition, Kemi, Finland
 16 November-31 December 2003: «Giraud-Moebius» exposition, Liège, Belgium
 4 March-28 April 2004: «L'Elixir du Docteur Gir/Moebius» exposition, Galerie Arludik, Paris, France
 December 2004-April 2005: «Giraud/Mœbius & Hayao Miyazaki» exposition at the Musée de la Monnaie de Paris, France
 15 March-15 April 2005: «JEAN GIRAUD: Exposition de dessins et planches originales de "DUST" le nouvel album de Blueberry aux editions Dargaud», Galerie Arludik, Paris, France; small exhibition for the occasion of the 28th Blueberry album release.
 June 2005: Exposition «Mythes Grecs» at the Stardom/Mœbius Production Art Gallery, Paris, France
 December 2005: «Jardins d'Eros» exposition at the Stardom/Mœbius Production Art Gallery, Paris, France
 February 2006: Exposition "sur le thème du Rêve" at the Centre d'arts plastiques contemporains de Bordeaux, France
 October 2006: «Boudha line» exposition at the Stardom/Mœbius Production Art Gallery, Paris, France
 May 2007: Exposition, Seoul, South-Korea
 May 2007: «Hommage au Major» exposition at the Stardom/Mœbius Production Art Gallery, Paris, France
 February 2008: «La citadelle du vertige» attraction from Futuroscope, (Poitiers), France; inspired by the Garage hermétique universe.
 June 2008: «Fou et Cavalier» exposition at l'Espace Cortambert/Mœbius Production, Paris, France
 15 January-14 June 2009: «Blueberry» exposition at the Maison de la bande dessinée, Brussels, Belgium
 May 2009: Exposition at the Kyoto International Manga Museum, Japan
 November 2009: «Arzak, destination Tassili» exposition at the SFL building located at 103 rue de Grenelle, Paris, France (Co-production of Espace Cortambert/SFL/Mœbius Production)
 12 October 2010 – 13 March 2011: «Mœbius transe forme» exposition at the Fondation Cartier pour l'art contemporain, Paris, France, which the museum had called "the first major exhibition in Paris devoted to the work of Jean Giraud, known by his pseudonyms Gir and Mœbius." A major and prestigious event, it reflected the status Giraud had by then attained in French (comic) culture. A massive, limited edition deluxe art book was released by the museum for the occasion.
 June–December 2011: «Mœbius multiple(s)» exposition at the Musée Thomas-Henry, Cherbourg-Octeville, France
A massive, 272 page hardcover art book, similar to the one released by the Parisian museum in 2010, was released as a deluxe, limited German/English bilingual edition exposition catalog by the museum for the occasion.
 10 July 2021 - 4 October 2021: «MOEBIUS - Alla ricerca del tempo» exposition at the Museo Archeologico Nazionale di Napoli (MANN), Naples, Italy. Exhibition organized around the theme of historical Italy, and in a sense an elaborate expansion of the earlier June 2005 «Mythes Grecs» exposition. Originally slated to open on 10 April 2021, the exhibition's opening was postponed by three months due the COVID-19 pandemic. For the occasion, a 176-page hardcover art book was released as a deluxe, limited edition French/Italian bilingual exposition catalog in a joint venture effort by publishers Moebius Production and  – hence its dual ISBNs, the French  one, and the Italian .
 25 October 2021 - 5 December 2021: «Hell, Purgatory, Paradise. Divine illustrations» exposition at the Accademia di Belle Arti di Firenze, Florence, Italy. The exhibition was held to celebrate the 700th anniversary of Dante's death, and included the illustrations of Giraud, Lorenzo Mattotti, and Milton Glaser previously compiled in a 1999 illustrated edition of the Divine Comedy. Originally planned to run until 25 November, the exhibition was already before its opening extended by ten days to 5 December.

Stamps
In 1988 Giraud was chosen, among 11 other winners of the prestigious Grand Prix of the Angoulême Festival, to illustrate a postage stamp set issued on the theme of communication.

Style
Giraud's working methods were various and adaptable ranging from etchings, white and black illustrations, to work in colour of the ligne claire genre and water colours. Giraud's solo Blueberry works were sometimes criticized by fans of the series because the artist dramatically changed the tone of the series as well as the graphic style. However, Blueberry early success was also due to Giraud's innovations, as he did not content himself with following earlier styles, an important aspect of his development as an artist.

To distinguish between work by Giraud and Moebius, Giraud used a brush for his own work and a pen when he signed his work as Moebius. Giraud was known for being an astonishingly fast draftsman.

His style has been compared to the Nouveaux réalistes, exemplified in his turn from the bowdlerized realism of Hergé's Tintin towards a grittier style depicting sex, violence and moral bankruptcy.

Aided with the use of mind-expanding substances in the first part of his career, Giraud had cultivated various New Age type philosophies throughout his career, such as Guy-Claude Burger's instinctotherapy, which influenced his creation of the comic book series Le Monde d'Edena. However, he dispensed with the use of drugs for the time being himself – though not condemning them, quite the contrary, as Giraud considered them a gateway to a hidden dreamworld ever since he was introduced in 1974 to the writings of Carlos Castaneda, and having started again with the use of marijuana in the last decade of his life, after a long abstinence – and outside teachers, or "gurus" as he himself had coined them, after his stay on Tahiti, instead continuing to seek deeper truths within himself on his own accord. However, it also negatively influenced his relationship with Philippe Charlier, heir and steward of his father's Blueberry co-creation and legacy, who had no patience whatsoever with Giraud's New Age predilections, particularly for his admitted fondness for mind-expanding substances. As 50% brand co-owner, Charlier jr. has vetoed several later Blueberry project proposals by Giraud, the aforementioned Blueberry 1900 project in particular, precisely for these reasons, as they were to prominently feature, Castaneda inspired, substance-induced scenes, going even as far as to (successfully) threaten Giraud with a lawsuit to thwart his intentions.Svane, 2003, p. 12

Vision and style: In the documentary MetaMoebius (2010) he claims his different styles may stem from his short-sightedness. When drawing without glasses he is more attuned to fine details but disconnected from the external world, but when drawing with glasses on he does not get into details but is more aware of the big picture. He often starts with glasses on to have a global perspective then later continues without glasses.

Death
Giraud died in Montrouge, on 10 March 2012, aged 73, after a long battle with cancer.. The immediate cause of death was pulmonary embolism caused by a lymphoma. Fellow comic artist François Boucq (incidentally, the artist pegged by Giraud in person for the artwork of the canceled Blueberry 1900 project) stated that Mœbius was a "master of realist drawing with a real talent for humour, which he was still demonstrating with the nurses when I saw him in his hospital bed a fortnight ago". Giraud was buried on 15 March, in the Montparnasse Cemetery, after the funeral services, held in the Saint Clotilde Basilica. Many friends and representatives from the Franco-Belgian comic world and beyond attended the services, mirroring Giraud's entire career in the industry. The French government was represented by its Minister of Culture, Frédéric Mitterrand, nephew of the former President of France François Mitterrand, who had personally awarded Giraud with his first civilian knighthood twenty-seven years earlier. Giraud left his estate to his second wife Isabelle and his four children.

Biography
Throughout his entire career, Jean Giraud gave numerous interviews both in Europe as well as in the United States, but it is the series of interview sessions conducted by comics journalist Numa Sadoul that warrants special attention. Sadoul took a particular interest in the artist and followed the career of Giraud closely from the mid-1970s onward until the latter's death in 2012, conducting extensive in-depth interviews with the artist throughout this period of time with approximate two-decade intervals, which resulted in three consecutive, chronologically organized interview books, Mister Mœbius et Docteur Gir (1976), Mœbius: Entretiens avec Numa Sadoul (1991), and Docteur Mœbius et Mister Gir: Entertiens avec Jean Giraud (2015, see below for bibliographical details on all editions), the latter two being each an edited, updated and expanded version of the previous one – and each title incidentally, featuring an entirely different selection of art. Excepting parts of the first book in SCHTROUMPF: Les cahiers de la BD (issue 25, July 1974), none of the later interviews had seen prior magazine publication, be it in part or in whole. The SCHTROUMPF interview excerpt, was by Giraud poured into a humorous eight-page autobiographical black & white comic (pp. 8–16). The comic, entitled "Entretien avec Jean Giraud", or "Mœbius Circa '74" as it is known in English, was however only reprinted in the 2015 edition of Sadoul's book as a preface, and in hindsight a precursor to Giraud's autobiographical Inside Mœbius comic books. The similarity had not been lost on the artist himself, after he had embarked on the Inside Mœbius series and realized, "Merde, that is exactly like the comic I have done with Numa!"

Noteworthy were the testimonials Sadoul collected from seminal persons in Giraud's life and career which included among others his mother, first wife Claudine (of these two the only known published ones), his mentor Jijé and many others, as well as the fact that Giraud spoke more freely about the aspects of his life and career (including the more contentious ones, such as his mind-expanding substance use and his extremely strained relationship with the aforementioned Philippe Charlier, which had over time deteriorated into open hatred) than was commonplace in his more generic interviews, or even in his own, hereafter mentioned, autobiography. For editorial reasons, Sadoul omitted some of the outside testimonials from the second edition for his third.

Posthumously published, the 2015 title was fully sanctioned and endorsed by Giraud's widow Isabelle (who provided a foreword – praising Sadoul for his friendship and tenacity – family pictures, privately created art and additional details on her husband's last two years of his life) and has therefore become the closest approximation of an "official biography" of the artist when discounting his own Inside Moebius autobiographical comic and his precursory text autobiography Histoire de mon double. The latter, published as an unillustrated paperback in 1999 was the "biography written by Giraud on Mœbius & vice versa", but constituted what Sadoul in his 2015 edition has coined a "snapshot in time", aside from the obvious fact that the last phase of the artist's career was not covered. Giraud himself considered his "enhanced" autobiography on which he had worked for a year, a "funny" piece of work, conceding that accuracy was left to be desired as he could not be bothered to correct mistakes made therein, finding "flavor" in the small inaccuracies, and also admitting that he gave his work only a cursory glance afterwards.

Author Sadoul accounted for his work in the introduction of the 2015 edition where he summarized that the interviews for the first edition took three days in March 1974 and in August and September 1975 – and thus shortly before Giraud achieved fame in his second "Mœbius" career – at the artist's home in Fontenay-sous-Bois. Having kept more detailed records, the second edition took in total 19 hours and 45 minutes of interviews conducted between 18 and 21 October 1988 at the Sadoul's home in Cagnes-sur-Mer (for which Giraud and his future wife Isabelle especially traveled from Paris), augmented with an additional two hours at Giraud's home in Paris on 17 August 1989. The third edition accounted for a further 10 hours and 48 minutes worth of interviews, conducted between 15 September 2000 and 28 December 2011, either at Giraud's home in Paris or over the telephone. Sadoul acknowledged that the three series of interview sessions were snapshots in time of Giraud's life and career, causing the artist to occasionally contradict himself in later life – something Giraud himself actually addressed in a humorous fashion in his Inside Moebius comics by regularly confronting his older self with his younger versions – , but chose not to redact or edit such earlier made statements (at most adding short, clarifying editorial annotations), instead transcribing these exactly as made at the time. Sadoul's reasoning was that by doing so, it reflected truthfully the spiritual development the artist had undergone throughout his career.

Influence and legacy

Long before his death Giraud had already been coined "the most influential bandes dessinées artist after Hergé" by several academic comic scholars, and many artists from around the world have cited him as a major influence on their work. The original "Chihuaha Pearl" album-cover-endowed 84-page Casemate issue featured, aside from an elaborate in-memoriam overview of Giraud's life and career, testimonials from 89 predominantly European comic artists, who often had their testimonials accompanied with their own Giraud/Mœbius-themed art made for the occasion. For the 96-page dBD issue, which came in two cover variants, "Giraud, mort d'un géant" ("Giraud, death of a giant") and "Mœbius, Adieu à l'immortel" ("Mœbius: Farewell to an immortal"), over 100 comic artists, this time added with international overseas artists, contributed art as tribute to the deceased artist. In January 2013, a similarly executed 64-page homage reverse double cover journal, became the first issue of the newly launched Tonnerre De Bulles! comics journal as issue Hors Série 1, which was followed by a similar 76-page Gir/Mœbius-themed double cover issue (Hors Série 5) in October 2015. Both issues were limited to 650 copies. The testimonials quoted below, gathered from other sources, are but a far from complete random selection of all the accolades given to the artist.

Giraud was longtime friends with manga author and anime filmmaker Hayao Miyazaki. Giraud even named his daughter Nausicaa after the character in Miyazaki's Nausicaä of the Valley of the Wind. Asked by Giraud in an interview how he first discovered his work, Miyazaki replied:

Through Arzach, which dates from 1975, I believe. I only read it in 1980, and it was a big shock. Not only for me. All manga authors were shaken by this work. Unfortunately, when I discovered it, I already had a consolidated style so I couldn't use its influence to enrich my drawing. Even today, I think it has an awesome sense of space. I directed Nausicaä under Mœbius's influence.

Mike Mignola, creator of Hellboy, has stated upon seeing Arzach,

I fell out of love with American comics, lost interest in the super-hero subject matter, was more interested in the fantasy I saw in the European art.

Pioneering cyberpunk author William Gibson said of Giraud's work, "The Long Tomorrow":

So it's entirely fair to say, and I've said it before, that the way Neuromancer-the-novel "looks" was influenced in large part by some of the artwork I saw in Heavy Metal. I assume that this must also be true of John Carpenter's Escape from New York, Ridley Scott's Blade Runner, and all other artefacts of the style sometimes dubbed 'cyberpunk'. Those French guys, they got their end in early.

"The Long Tomorrow" also came to the attention of Ridley Scott and was a key visual reference for Blade Runner. Having previously cooperated with the artist on his 1979 sci-fi thriller Alien, Scott stated as late as 2010 on Mœbius' influence on contemporary science fiction movies:

You see it everywhere, it runs through so much you can't get away from it.

Comic artist, publisher and editor Stephen R. Bissette, responsible for the first-time publication of "Les yeux du chat" in English, had it recorded that,

When I first saw the work of 'Mœbius' – a.k.a. 'Gir', both noms de plume of Jean Giraud – his fresh science-fiction and fantasy comic art forever altered my perception of the comic medium.

George Lucas, who had invited Giraud to work with him on his 1988 fantasy movie Willow, wrote in the foreword of the 1989 "The Art of Mœbius" art book,

In all his drawings, Mœbius demonstrates a command of many disciplines in art. He is a master draftsman, a superb artist, and more: his vision is original and strong. Since first seeing the Mœbius illustrations in Heavy Metal years ago, I have been impressed and affected by his keen and unusual sense of design, and the distinctive way in which he depicts the fantastic. perhaps what strikes me most of all his work is its sheer beauty–a beauty that has always given me great pleasure.

British author and comic artist Neil Gaiman, with whom Giraud collaborated on Gaiman's The Sandman series, stated,

I read [Métal Hurlant] over and over and envied the French because they had everything I dreamed of in comics – beautifully drawn, visionary and literate comics, for adults. I wanted to make comics like that when I grew up.

"I consider him more important than Doré", said Italian filmmaker Federico Fellini:

He's a unique talent endowed with an extraordinary visionary imagination that's constantly renewed and never vulgar. Moebius disturbs and consoles. He has the ability to transport us into unknown worlds where we encounter unsettling characters. My admiration for him is total. I consider him a great artist, as great as Picasso and Matisse.

Following Giraud's death, Brazilian author Paulo Coelho paid tribute on Twitter stating:

The great Moebius died today, but the great Mœbius is still alive. Your body died today, your work is more alive than ever.

Benoît Mouchart, artistic director at France's Angoulême International Comics Festival, made an assessment of his importance to the field of comics:

France has lost one of its best known artists in the world. In Japan, Italy, in the United States he is an incredible star who influenced world comics. Mœbius will remain part of the history of drawing, in the same right as Dürer or Ingres. He was an incredible producer, he said he wanted to show what eyes do not always see.

French Culture Minister Frédéric Mitterrand, speaking at his funeral services at Saint Clotilde Basilica on 15 March 2012, said that by the simultaneous death of Giraud and Mœbius, France had lost "two great artists". By both his presence and speech Mitterrand essentially cemented Giraud's status as France's premier standard bearer of "Le Neuvième Art" ("the 9th art"), the bande dessinée has officially become recognized as.

Awards and honors

 1969 & 1970: Prix Phénix Paris (France), for Lieutenant Blueberry in the category "La Meilleure Serie d'Aventures".
 1972: "Best Realistic Artist" Special Award from the National Cartoonists Society (USA) for Lieutenant Blueberry.
 1973: Shazam Award (USA), for Lieutenant Blueberry in the category "Best Foreign Comic Series", shared with Jean-Michel Charlier.
 1975: , Lucca Comics & Games (Italy), in the category "Best Foreign Artist".
 1977: Angoulême International Comics Festival (France) Best French Artist
 1978: Goldene Sprechblase Award, Vereinigung für Comic-Literatur (Austria) for Leutnant Blueberry in the category "Besondere Verdienste um die Comic-Literatur".
 1979: Adamson Award (Sweden), for Lieutenant Blueberry in the category "Best International Comic-Strip [or comic book] Cartoonist".
 1980: Yellow Kid Award, Lucca Comics & Games (Italy), in the category "Best Foreign Author".
 1980: Grand Prix de la Science Fiction Française, Special Prize, for Major Fatal.
 1981: Grand Prix de la ville d'Angoulême (France), Angoulême International Comics Festival.
 1982: Fantafestival Award (Italy) for Les Maîtres du temps in the category "Best Children's Film", shared with Director René Laloux.
 1985: Grand Prix for the graphic arts, Angoulême International Comics Festival (France).
 1985: Dubbed Chevalier de l'Ordre des Arts et des Lettres, French civilian knighthood, in 2014 posthumously elevated to the rank of "", the highest rank of the order.
 1986: Inkpot Award (USA)
 1988: Harvey Award (USA), for Moebius album series by Marvel/Epic in the category "Best American Edition of Foreign Material".
 1989: Eisner Award (USA), for Silver Surfer in the category "Best Finite Series".
 1989: Harvey Award (USA), for Incal by Marvel/Epic in the category "Best American Edition of Foreign Material".
 1989: Haxtur Award (Spain), Salón Internacional del Cómic del Principado de Asturias, Spain, for The Incal in the category "Best Drawings"
 1991: Eisner Award (USA), for Concrete in the category "Best Single Issue".
 1991: Harvey Award (USA), for Lieutenant Blueberry by Marvel/Epic in the category "Best American Edition of Foreign Material".
 1991: Haxtur Award (Spain), Salón Internacional del Cómic del Principado de Asturias, for La Diosa (The Goddess) in the category "Best Drawings".
 1996: Soleil d'Or of the Festival BD de Solliès-Ville (France) for Blueberry: "Mister Blueberry", in the category "Best Comic Album"
 1997: Designated finalist for induction into the Harvey Award Jack Kirby Hall of Fame (USA) in 1989, inducted in 1997.
 1997: World Fantasy Award (USA) in the category "Best Artist".
 1998: Induction into the Will Eisner Award Hall of Fame (USA).
 2000: Max & Moritz Prizes (Germany), Special Prize for outstanding life's work.
 2000: Sproing Award (Norway) for Blueberry: "Geronimo" in the category "Best Translated Strips".
 2001: Spectrum Grandmaster (USA)
 2001: Haxtur Award (Spain), Salón Internacional del Cómic del Principado de Asturias, for The Crowned Heart, in the category "Best Long Comic Strip".
 2003: Haxtur Award (Spain), Salón Internacional del Cómic del Principado de Asturias, in the category "Author That We Love".
 2004:  (France) as "Mœbius" in the category "Life-time Achievement".
 2009: Lauriers Verts de La Forêt des Livres - Prix BD (France) for Le Chasseur Déprime.
 2011: Induction into the Science Fiction Hall of Fame (USA).. [Quote: "EMP is proud to announce the 2011 Hall of Fame inductees: ..."]. May/June/July 2011. EMP Museum (empmuseum.org). Archived 21 July 2011. Retrieved 19 March 2013.
 2011: Dubbed Chevalier de l'Ordre National du Mérite (France) for his contributions to French culture, French civilian knighthood.
 2017: Eisner Award (USA), for Moebius Library: The World of Edena in the category "Best U.S. Edition of International Material".
 2018: Asteroid 109435 Giraud was named in his memory. The official naming citation was published by the Minor Planet Center on 25 September 2018.
 2020 Society of Illustrators Hall of Fame (USA).

BibliographyNote: those works for which English translations have been published are noted as such. Their respective pages describe this further, and/or is detailed in section .As Jean Gir[aud]
Comic albums & seriesBlueberry (29 volumes, 1965–2007, partial English translation), artist (all vol), (co-)writer vol 24–29 (writer vol. 1–24: Jean Michel Charlier)La Jeunesse de Blueberry (Young Blueberry, 1968–1970, volumes 1–3, English translation), artist (writer: Jean Michel Charlier)
"Gir." ("The detour", one-shot, comic/artbook hybrid, 1974, English translation), writer and artist
"Jason Muller: Récits des temps post-atomiques!" (one-shot, 1975), writer second part & stand-alone short (artist: Claude Auclair, writer first part: Linus)Jim Cutlass (7 volumes, 1979–1999, vol. 1 English translation), artist vol. 1 (writer: Jean Michel Charlier), writer vol. 2–7Gir œuvres: "Tome 1, Le lac des émeraudes" (short stories collection, partially in English translation, 1980), (co-)writer and artist
"La ferme de animaux" (one-shot, 1985), writerAltor (The Magic Crystal, 7 volumes, 1986–2003, vol. 1–3 in English translation), writer (artist: Marc Bati)Marshal Blueberry (3 volumes, 1991–2000), writer (artist vol. 1–2: William Vance,)XIII 18: "La Version irlandaise" (2007, "The Irish Version", English translation), artist (writer: Jean van Hamme)
ArtbooksGir œuvres, "Tome 2: Le tireur solitaire" (1983), artist
"Blueberry's" (1997), artist
Illustrated books
"Hommes et cavernes: nos ancetres il y a 20,000 ans" (1957), co-artist (writer: Francois Desprez, co-artist: Guy Mouminoux)
"Sept filles dans la brousse" (1958), (cover-)artist (writer: Phyllis M. Power)
"Amérique an mille" (1959), cover and co-artist (writer: G. Travelier, co-artist: Guy Mouminoux)L'histoire des civilisations (volumes 1–4, 1961–1963), unsigned co-artist (writer[s]: Hachette editors, co-artist: Jean-Claude Mézières)
"Buffalo Bill: le roi des éclaireurs" (1968, "Buffalo Bill, Scout and Frontiersman", English translation), cover and interior co-artist (writer: , co-artist: Jean Marcellin)
"Olivier chez Les Cow-Boys" (1969), artist (writer: Pierre Christin, photo illustrator: Jean-Claude Mézières)
"La Fleur du désert" ("Goldenrod", originally in English, 1976), cover artist (writer: Herbert Harker)Morgan Kane (volumes 1–7, English translations, but not the by Giraud cover illustrated 1979 French editions), cover artist (writer:Louis Masterson)
L'univers de 1: "Gir." (1986), cover and interior co-artist (writers and co-artists: several)

As Mœbius
Comic albums & series
"Le Bandard fou" (1974, The Horny Goof, English translation), writer and artist
"Arzach" (1976, English translation), writer and artist
"Cauchemar blanc" (1974, "White nightmare", English translation), writer and artist
"John Watercolor et sa redingote qui tue!!" (1977, "The Early Mœbius & Other Humorous Stories", English translation), writer and artist
"L'Homme est-il bon?" (1977, Is Man Good?, English translation7), writer and artist
which includes: "The Long Tomorrow" (1976, French original despite English title, English translation), artist (writer: Dan O'Bannon)Le Garage Hermétique (1976–1980, The Airtight Garage, English translation), writer and artist
"Les Yeux du Chat" (1978, The Eyes of the Cat, English translation), artist (writer: Alejandro Jodorowsky)
"Tueur de monde" (1979), writer and artist
"La déviation" (1980, The Detour, English translation), artist and (co-)writer (co-writer: Claudine Conin)l'Incal (1981–1988, The Incal, 6 volumes, English translation), artist (writer: Alejandro Jodorowsky)
"Les Maîtres du temps" (1982), artist and (co-)writer (co-writer: René Laloux)Le Monde d'Edena (1985–2001, The World of Edena, 6 volumes, English translation), writer and artist
"La nuit de l'étoile" (1986), writer and artist (co-writer: Jean-Paul Appel-Guéry; co-artist: Marc Bati)Altor (1986-2003, The Magic Crystal, 7 volumes, English translation volume 1–3), writer (artist: Marc Bati)Silver Surfer: Parable (originally in English, 1988–1989), artist (writer: Stan Lee)
"Escale sur Pharagonescia" (1989, Pharagonesia, English translation), writer and artistThe Elsewhere Prince (originally in English, 1990), writer (artist: Eric Shanower)
"Silence, on rêve" (1991), writer and co-artist (co-artists: various)
which includes: "Marie Dakar" ("Marie Dakar", English translation), writer and artistOnyx Overlord (originally in English, 1992), writer (artist: Jerry Bingham)Les Vacances du Major (1992), writer and artistLe Cœur couronné (1992, Madwoman of the Sacred Heart, 3 volumes, English translation), artist (writer: Alejandro Jodorowsky)Little Nemo (volumes 1–2, 1994–1995), writerL'Homme du Ciguri (1995, The Man from the Ciguri, English translation), writer and artist
"40 Days dans le Désert B" (1999, no English edition, but as a text-less graphic novel intended for international release), writer and artistAprès l'Incal (2000, volume 1: Le Nouveau Rêve, English translation), artist (writer: Alejandro Jodorowsky)Inside Mœbius (2000–2010, 6 volumes, English translation), writer and artistIcare (2000, Icaro, originally in Japanese, 2 volumes, English translation), writer (artist: Jirô Taniguchi)
"The Halo Graphic Novel" (originally in English, Chapter 4: "Second Sunrise over New Mombasa", 2006), artist (writer: Brett Lewis)
"Le Chasseur Déprime" (2008), writer and artistArzak L'Arpenteur (2010), writer and artistLe Major (2011), writer and artist
Artbooks
"Mœbius" (1980), writer and artistMoebius œuvres complètes, "Tome 4: La Complainte de l'Homme Programme" (1982), writer and artist
"La memoire du futur/Starwatcher" (1983), writer and artistMoebius œuvres complètes, "Tome 5: Le Désintégré Réintégré" (1984), writer and artist
"Venise céleste" (1984), writer and artist
"Made in L.A." (1988), writer and artist
"The Art of Mœbius" (originally in English, 1989), writer and artist
"Quatre-vingt huit" (1990), writer and artist 
"Chaos" (English translation, 1991), writer and artist
"Chroniques métalliques" (1992, "Metallic Memories", English translation), writer and artist
"Visions of Arzach" (originally in English, 1993), cover artist (artists: several)
"Griffes d'Ange" (1994, "Angel Claw", English translation), artist (writer: Alejandro Jodorowsky)
"Fusions" (1995, "Fusion", English translation), writer and artist
"Moebius transe forme" (2010), artist
"La Faune de Mars" (2011), writer and artist
Illustrated books
"La parapsychologie et vous" (1980), artist (writer: Paula Salomon)
"Project Pendulum" (originally in English, 1987), artist (writer: Robert Silverberg)
"Les Mystères de l'Incal" (1989, "Deconstructing The Incal", English translation), artist (writers: Jean Annestay, Alejandro Jodorowsky)Legends of Arzach (originally in English, 6 volumes, 1992), artist (writer: R.J.M. Lofficier)
"Les Histoires de Monsieur Mouche" (1994), artist
"L'Alchemiste" ("The Alchemist", English translation, but not the by Mœbius illustrated 1994 French edition), artist (writer: Paulo Coelho)
"Ballades" (1995), artist (writer: François Villon) La Divina Commedia: Paradiso (1999), artist (writer: Dante Alighieri)
"Moebius Arzach" (originally in English, 2000), artist (writer: R.J.M. Lofficier)
"2001 Après Jésus Christ" (2000), artist (writer: Jean-Luc Coudray)

English (collected) editionsNotes: for particulars on the English-language Blueberry publications, please refer to main article; corresponding digital releases are not included for expediency; where available, links to the Grand Comics Database provided for detailed content descriptions of the individual short story collections.With the below referenced posthumous publishing efforts of Dark Horse Books that started in 2016, Giraud has become, along with fellow artist Enki Bilal from his Métal hurlant days, one of the relatively few European graphic novel artists to have the bulk of their body of work translated in the English language.

HM Communications
The English-language versions of many of Mœbius' comics have been collected into various editions, beginning with a small series of US graphic novel sized trade paperbacks from HM Communications, Inc., collecting work originally published in its Heavy Metal magazine (the US version of the French original, co-founded by Giraud), and in which Moebius' work was introduced to American readership in the 1970s. It has been noted by Taboo Editor-in-Chief Stephen R. Bissette that the quality of the translations of HM Communications had been very poor.Heavy Metal presents (1977–1981)
 Arzach (64 pages, HM Communications, 1977)
 Is Man Good? (64 pages, HM Communications, 1978)
 Moebius (96 pages, HM Communications, 1981, issued without ISBN); art/comic book hybrid with an introduction by Federico Fellini, featuring a selection of art lifted from the French 1980 "Mœbius" source art book, and the entirety of the first volume of the Incal series, "The Black Incal", therefore constituting the first English-language book release of the series.

Marvel/Epic
A far more comprehensive effort was undertaken at Marvel Comics under its Epic imprint in the late 1980s and early 1990s, initiated, translated and introduced by Jean-Marc and Randy Lofficier. The intent was to collect all comics Giraud had hitherto published in Europe as Mœbius into one single format collection, and in this Epic largely succeeded, when the eventual two – three when counting Blueberry as well – collections had run their courses around 1992. When initiated, the collections were otherwise unaltered published in Great Britain as well, with a lag ranging from a few months to a year, by Titan Books in a smaller print run of 6.000 copies per title – like the previous HM Communications book releases had been – as opposed to the initial 20.000 copies per title release by Epic with a continuous reprint option for those volumes selling out while the Epic publication effort was underway, a relative novelty in the US comic world at the time. However, of the eventual eleven titles in the Fantasies softcover collection, only six (Mœbius 1 - Mœbius 6) were ultimately released by Titan Books. With the exception of Mœbius 9 – Stel (itself a very late addition to the Fantasies collection, being a near simultaneous international 1994 release), Giraud created new cover art for the Marvel/Epic releases, including the Incal (and Blueberry) series. Save for Mœbius  and aside from the covers, it was for the Fantasies collection that stories originally done in black & white in the French source publications, received first time coloring, most notably The Airtight Garage, but excepting the seminal short story "The Detour". Remarkably, Epic was aided by outsiders Dark Horse Comics and Graphitti Designs, who each added a volume to the Fantasies collection, adhering to the style and format as set by Epic, in which work was published Marvel/Epic itself apparently deemed too controversial to publish themselves, particularly the 0-volume for its heavy, albeit humorous, phallic theme.

Though some purist fans have frowned upon the coloring of the originally black & white stories, the Marvel/Epic Fantasies collection has nevertheless served as the template for similar collections subsequently released in not only native France, but in other countries as well.The Collected Fantasies of Jean Giraud (1987–1994):
 Mœbius 0 – The Horny Goof & Other Underground Stories (72 pages, Dark Horse Comics, June 1990)
 Mœbius  – The Early Mœbius & Other Humorous Stories (60 pages, Graphitti Designs, 1992); black & white, expanded English-language version of "John Watercolor et sa redingote qui tue!!"
 Mœbius 1 – Upon A Star (72 pages, Marvel/Epic, September 1987, ; Titan, 1988)
 Mœbius 2 – Arzach & Other Fantasy Stories (72 pages, Marvel/Epic, April 1987, ; Titan, November 1988)
 Mœbius 3 – The Airtight Garage (120 pages, Marvel/Epic, April 1987, ; Titan, January 1990)
 Mœbius 4 – The Long Tomorrow & Other Science Fiction Stories (70 pages, Marvel/Epic, 1987, ; Titan, February 1988)
 Mœbius 5 – The Gardens of Aedena (72 pages, Marvel/Epic, 1988, ; Titan, 1988)
 Mœbius 6 – Pharagonesia & Other Strange Stories (72 pages, Marvel/Epic, June 1987, ; Titan, June 1988)
 Mœbius 7 – The Goddess (88 pages, Marvel/Epic, October 1990)
 Mœbius 8 – Mississippi River (64 pages, Marvel/Epic, January 1991)
 Mœbius 9 – Stel (80 pages, Marvel/Epic, 1994); executed in the European standard A4 comic album format as opposed to the smaller American graphic novel format hitherto employed.The Incal collection (1988)
Mœbius' magnum opus as such, The Incal, was separately released both in the US and Great Britain in its own mini series, each title collecting two of the original French source publications:
 The Incal 1 (96 pages, Marvel/Epic, July 1988, ; Titan, 1988)
 The Incal 2 (118 pages, Marvel/Epic, 1988, ; Titan, October 1988)
 The Incal 3 (96 pages, Marvel/Epic, September 1988, ; Titan, November 1988)

The Marvel/Epic graphic novel releases earned Giraud his three Harvey Awards in the category "Best American Edition of Foreign Material" in 1988 (for the Fantasies collection), in 1989 (for The Incal collection) and in 1991 (for the Blueberry collection).The Silver Surfer (1988–2012)
This miniseries won Giraud his Eisner Award for best finite/limited series in 1989, each comic book issue enjoying a print run of 200,000 copies.
 The Silver Surfer, Part 1 (32 pages, Epic, December 1988); US standard comic book.
 The Silver Surfer, Part 2 (32 pages, Epic, January 1989); US standard comic book.
 The Silver Surfer (68 pages, Epic, December 1988); with new cover and editorial enhanced, limited deluxe hardcover anthology edition in dust jacket, though print run is unknown.
 The Silver Surfer: Parable (68 pages, Marvel, 1998/Q1); softcover trade paperback reissue.
 The Silver Surfer: Parable (168 pages, Marvel, May 2012); hardcover trade edition, augmented with work from Keith Pollard, concurrently released as a numbered, limited to 640 copies, hardcover edition in dust jacket.

Art Books (1989–1995)
In between, Epic Comics did release four stand-alone art book titles, with Chaos and Metallic Memories reproducing most of the 1980 original:The Art of Mœbius (96 pages, Epic/Byron Preiss, October 1989); softcover US graphic novel format, collecting a selection of art previously published in the French source publications, including "La memoire du futur", but – being otherwise an American initiative – it does not adhere to either the content or size format of the source publications, rather featuring artist's annotations on each piece of artwork. Foreword by George Lucas.Chaos (96 pages, Epic, November 1991); hardcover book in deviant 30x30cm format issued without dust jacket, faithful reproduction of the French source publication.Metallic Memories (88 pages, Epic, November 1992); hardcover book in deviant 30x30cm format issued without dust jacket, faithful reproduction of the French source publication.Fusion (126 pages, Epic, 1995); oversized European graphic novel format hardcover book issued without dust jacket, faithful reproduction of the French source publication.The Elsewhere Prince (1990)
While Giraud (with Lofficier) was only the co-writer of this US standard comic book mini series, which took place in "The Airtight Garage" universe, there was additional art from him featured in short accompanying editorials, as well as one to two page short stories.
 Sonnet 1: The Jouk (32 pages, Epic, May 1990)
 Sonnet 2: The Princess (32 pages, Epic, June 1990)
 Sonnet 3: Abagoo (32 pages, Epic, July 1990)
 Sonnet 4: The Prince (32 pages, Epic, August 1990)
 Sonnet 5: The Bouch' Tarhai (32 pages, Epic, September 1990)
 Sonnet 6: The Artist (32 pages, Epic, October 1990)Onyx Overlord (1992–1993)
By Giraud co-written sequel to The Elsewhere Prince, and like that series, also featuring additional art from his hand. While Giraud was very pleased with Shanower's art for The Elsewhere Prince for its "naive qualities" he found very fitting for the story-arc, he was deeply disappointed with Bingham's art for Onyx Overlord, considering the work of the "old comics veteran" uninspired and "truly undignified", suspecting Bingham did not like the work. Because of this, Giraud decided not to dispatch the already completed scenarios for Logs 5 and 6. Disappointing sales of the European editions left the cycle uncompleted indefinitely.
 Log 1: Armjourth (32 pages, Epic, October 1992)
 Log 2: Randomearth Yby (32 pages, Epic, November 1992)
 Log 3: Onyx (32 pages, Epic, December 1992)
 Log 4: Return to Armjourth (32 pages, Epic, January 1993)Moebius' Airtight Garage (1993)
Standard US comic book reissue of the 1987 graphic novel, with some additional art in the editorials.
 Volume 1 (32 pages, Epic, July 1993)
 Volume 2 (32 pages, Epic, August 1993)
 Volume 3 (32 pages, Epic, September 1993)
 Volume 4 (32 pages, Epic, October 1993)The Halo Graphic Novel (2006)
Comprising four chapters, Giraud provided the 16-page art for chapter 4, "Second Sunrise over New Mombasa". In the editorial of the novel (p. 99), Giraud explained that son Raphaël's enjoyment of the game series ultimately compelled him to accept an invitation to contribute his art; before penciling the story, he had never played the video games.
 The Halo Graphic Novel (128 pages, Marvel, August 2006); hardcover in dust jacket, US graphic novel format
 Halo Graphic Novel (128 pages, Marvel, June 2010); softcover trade paperback, US graphic novel format

Graphitti Designs
Excepting The Art of Mœbius, Mœbius 9, Fusion (being Johnny-come-lately's, the latter two were released too late for inclusion, whereas the first one, having been a co-publication, could not for copyright reasons), The Silver Surfer and The Elsewhere Prince/Onyx Overlord, all these volumes were very shortly thereafter reissued by Graphitti Designs – having themselves added a volume to the Collected Fantasies series – as part of their signed and numbered, "Limited Hardcover Edition" 1500 copy each collection (in dust jacket), combining these with the similar Blueberry releases by Epic and Catalan Communications, in a single "Mœbius" ten-volume complete works anthology release. Excepting the last volume, the Mœbius collection was executed in the standard European graphic novel size. The "Young Blueberry" and "Virtual Meltdown" anthology titles differed from the others in that they were not printed on high gloss paper, but on matte paper as in the original ComCat/Epic publications, and was in itself a stark indication – aside from the very quick release after the original Marvel/Epic/ComCat individual publications – that the Graphitti Designs release had always been foreseen, resulting in that the original print run of the interior pages for the individual volumes had already accounted for inclusion in the anthology collection as well.Mœbius anthology collection (1988–1993)
 Limited Hardcover Edition 12 - Mœbius 1 (272 pages, Graphitti Designs, July 1987); collects Moebius 1 - 3
 Limited Hardcover Edition 13 - Mœbius 2 (220 pages, Graphitti Designs, 1988); collects Moebius 4 - 6
 Limited Hardcover Edition 14 - Mœbius 3; The Incal (312 pages, Graphitti Designs, 1988); collects the Marvel/Epic Incal series
 Limited Hardcover Edition 22 - Mœbius 4; Blueberry (240 pages, Graphitti Designs, 1989); collects the Marvel/Epic Blueberry series
 Limited Hardcover Edition 23 - Mœbius 5; Blueberry (240 pages, Graphitti Designs, 1990); collects the Marvel/Epic Blueberry series
 Limited Hardcover Edition 24 - Mœbius 6; Young Blueberry (168 pages, Graphitti Designs, 1990); collects the ComCat Young Blueberry series
 Limited Hardcover Edition 35 - Mœbius 7 (220 pages, Graphitti Designs, 1990); collects Moebius 0, and 7
 Limited Hardcover Edition 36 - Mœbius 8; Blueberry (240 pages, Graphitti Designs, 1991); collects the Marvel/Epic Blueberry series
 Limited Hardcover Edition 37 - Mœbius 9; Blueberry (180 pages, Graphitti Designs, 1991); collects the Marvel/Epic Blueberry series & Moebius 8; erroneous use of the same ISBN as the previous volume
 Limited Hardcover Edition 44 - Virtual Meltdown: Images of Mœbius (188 pages, Graphitti Designs, 1993); collects Chaos and Metallic Memories; issued without dust jacket in deviant 30x30cm format

Dark HorseThe Abyss (1989)
This mini comic book series, is the comic adaptation of the eponymous movie. The eight-page editorials in each are dedicated to the production design art Giraud had provided for the movie.The Abyss, issue 1 (32 pages, Dark Horse Comics, June 1989)The Abyss, issue 2 (32 pages, Dark Horse Comics, July 1989)Concrete (1990)
This special in the Concrete comic book series, featured the first time, full color publication of the 23-page short story "The Still Planet", set in the Edena universe. Accounting for half the contents of the comic book, the story was instrumental in making Mœbius co-winner of the 1991 Eisner Award in the category "Best Single Issue".Concrete Celebrates Earth Day 1990 (52 pages, Dark Horse Comics, April 1990)Dark Horse Presents (1992-1993)Issue 63 (32 pages, Dark Horse Comics, June 1992)
 "Marie Dakar"; eight-page text-less short story and cover artist.Issues 70-76 (32 pages, Dark Horse Comics, February - August 1993)
 "Madwoman of the Sacred Heart" (Volume 1); black & white, art and cover artist issues 70 and 73City of Fire art portfolio (1993)
The fourth Mœbius outing of Dark Horse concerned a reissue of the art portfolio La Cité Feu – a collaborative art project of Giraud with Geoff Darrow – Starwatcher Graphics had released as an English language (for the introduction folio) "Limited American lux edition" version of 100 signed and numbered copies in January 1985 under its original title, alongside the French 950 copy original by Aedena. Some of the art is reproduced in the aforementioned Fusion art book by Epic.
 City of Fire (10 folios, Dark Horse, 1993); Unsigned and limited, though print run is unknown, 14.5"x19" sized lithograph prints with cover folio in envelope, as opposed to the hardboard box of the 1985 release. Also lacking the by Mœbius written introduction folio for that release, original cover, description and two black and white art folios, which are however replaced by two color additions.Mœbius collection (1996)
Having added the 0-volume to the Collected Fantasies series in 1990, Dark Horse Comics too decided to release a Mœbius specific – meaning without his Western work – collection themselves, this time executed in the standard US comic book-sized format and soliciting the editorial input from Jean-Marc Lofficier who had already done so for the previous efforts. Though much of the contents was essentially a recapitulation of the Marvel/Epic publications, Lofficier made use of the opportunity to add work Mœbius had created after the Marvel/Epic publications had run its course, such as the story The Man from the Ciguri (a sequel to The Airtight Garage) and the first two outings of the Madwomen of the sacred Heart series.
 Arzach (80 pages, Dark Horse Comics, February 1996)
 Exotics (80 pages, Dark Horse Comics, April 1996) 
 The Man from the Ciguri (80 pages, Dark Horse Comics, May 1996), collecting the episodes as originally serialized in black & white in the publisher's Cheval Noir (French for Dark Horse) magazine (issues 26–30, 33–37, 40–41, and 50, 1992–1994). 
 H.P.'s Rock City (80 pages, Dark Horse Comics, June 1996) 
 Madwomen of the sacred Heart (144 pages, Dark Horse Comics, August 1996); black & white, collecting the first volume as serialized in their 1993 Dark Horse Presents magazine, augmented with volume 2.Mœbius Library (2016-)
Twenty years later, in April 2016, Dark Horse announced an ambitious project called the "Mœbius Library" to be released by its book division in American graphic novel hardcover format. The stated intent was to predominantly publish latter day work by Mœbius in conjunction with, and originally published under the auspices of, his own publishing house "Mœbius Production", headed after his death in 2012 by second wife Isabelle. The first title was released in October 2016, which promptly won an Eisner Award.
 Mœbius Library 1 - The World of Edena (360 pages, Dark Horse Books, October 2016); featuring the first time English language version of the last installment Sra, thereby completing The World of Edena series in English. Recipient of a 2017 Eisner Award in the category "Best U.S. Edition of International Material".
 Mœbius Library 2 - Inside Moebius, Part 1 (216 pages, Dark Horse Books, February 2018); collects the first two volumes of the French source publication
 Mœbius Library 3 - The Art of Edena  (208 pages, Dark Horse Books, April 2018); art/comic book hybrid, collects the Edena short stories as well as Edena associated art.
 Mœbius Library 4 - Inside Moebius, Part 2 (264 pages, Dark Horse Books, June 2018); collects the middle two volumes of the French source publication
 Mœbius Library 5 - Inside Moebius, Part 3 (280 pages, Dark Horse Books, October 2018); collects the last two volumes of the French source publicationHalo Graphic Novel (2021)
 Halo Graphic Novel (128 pages, Dark Horse Books, October 2021); softcover trade paperback, US graphic novel format; reprint of the 2010 Marvel edition.

Kitchen Sink Press
Kitchen Sink Press was a publisher of underground comics, explaining the French Ticklers series, and had connotations with HM Communications, adopting some of its artist after the latter had become defunct. Concurrently they had merged with Tundra Publishing in 1993, explaining the Visions of Arzach anthology art book.French Ticklers (1989-1990)
A short-lived comic book series, collecting work from French underground comic artists, including Giraud. Giraud's contributions concerned some of his early "Mœbius" work he had produced for Hara-Kiri in 1963–1964. Graphitti Designs subsequently collected all early Mœbius work in their 1992 Collected Fantasies contribution as "Mœbius ½". All three black & white issues featured a (color) cover by Mœbius.Issue 1 (32 pages, Kitchen Sink Press, October 1989) Issue 2 (32 pages, Kitchen Sink Press, December 1989) Issue 3 (32 pages, Kitchen Sink Press, February 1990)Legends of Arzach (1992)
This original American publication consists of six, 9.2"x12.2" sized, art portfolios, each of them containing an introduction plate, a by Giraud illustrated booklet featuring a short story by R.J.M. Lofficier, set in the Arzach universe, and eight art prints by American comic artists, paying homage to Mœbius' seminal character, 48 in total. Lofficier later expanded upon his short stories in his 2000 book title by iBOOKS, mentioned below.
 Gallery 1 - Charcoal burner of Ravenwood (Tundra Publishing, January 1992)
 Gallery 2 - White Pteron (Tundra Publishing, March 1992)
 Gallery 3 - Keep of two moons (Tundra Publishing, May 1992)
 Gallery 4 - The Rock of Everlasting Despair (Tundra Publishing, July 1992)
 Gallery 5 - The Keeper of the Earth's Treasures (Tundra Publishing, September 1992)
 Gallery 6 - The Fountains of Summer (Tundra Publishing, November 1992)

"Visions of Arzach" (1993)
Original American art book publication with a new cover by Mœbius, collecting the art prints by American artists from Legends of Arzach with a few additions.
 Visions of Arzach (56 pages, Kitchen Sink Press, December 1993); European graphic novel format sized hardcover trade edition.

iBOOKS
iBOOKS Inc. was a publishing imprint of Byron Preiss, who had previously been the editor-in-chief and co-publisher of the 1989 The Art of Mœbius book by Epic. Preiss incidentally, was also the editor-in-chief for the hereafter mentioned by Mœbius illustrated 1987 Project Pendulum science fiction novel.

"Mœbius Arzach" (2000)
 Mœbius Arzach (291 pages, iBOOKS, August 2000); Illustrated trade paperback softcover novel, taking place in the Arzach universe.Icaro (2003–2004)
 Book 1 (160 pages, iBOOKS, November 2003); Softcover trade paperback
 Book 2 (140 pages, iBOOKS, January 2004); Softcover trade paperback

Humanoids Publishing
After the initial cooperation with DC Comics in the mid-2000s, publisher Humanoids, Inc. (until 2013 the US subsidiary of the French publisher co-founded by Moebius in 1974) has from 2010 onward begun to reissue new editions of Mœbius works on its own, starting with two of Mœbius's past collaborations with Alejandro Jodorowsky: The Incal and Madwoman of the Sacred Heart. Humanoids releases these latter-day hardcover editions, usually without dust jacket, in variant size formats, US graphic novel format (trade editions), oversized format (which is essentially the larger, standard European graphic novel A4 format), and the even larger coffee table format, the latter typically in a limited print run. Aside from the English language publications, Humanoids occasionally imports French deluxe, limited edition specialty Moebius editions, such as Le Garage hermétique and Arzach, from the parent publisher especially on behalf of its American readership. The post-2010 Humanoids editions are also intended for, and disseminated to, the British-Canadian and UK markets, with the exception of two 2011 Incal editions, which were licensed and featured variant cover art.The Metabarons (2002)
Giraud had created one 8-page short story "Au coeur de l'inviolable meta bunker" in 1989, focusing on one of the major secondary characters from the Incal saga, The Metabaron, whose ancestry later received its own The Metabarons spin-off series. Though that story was redrawn by the series' artist Juan Giménez for later book publications, Giraud's original was published in black & white in the below-mentioned 1990 British publication, and subsequently included in an outing of Humanoids' "Prestige Format Comic Book" collection as "Metabaron 1: The Lost Pages", which introduced Valérie Beltran's new coloring for Giraud's Incal series.The Metabarons: "Alpa/Omega" (48 pages, Humanoids Inc, October 2002); Softcover trade editionThe Incal (2005–2022)
Excepting the early 2005 co-productions with DC Comics, all subsequent editions feature the original coloring. The two co-editions with DC featured an entirely new coloring by Valérie Beltran as well as some censorship in regard to nudity, neither of which sitting well with writer Jodorowsky, who interpreted the changes as a cheap ploy to entice a younger readership. Customer reviews for both titles on Amazon.com, showed that fans were largely in concordance with Jodorowsky's assessment. Considered a commercial failure, Beltran's coloring has never been used again after the initial (international) releases, be it in the United States or elsewhere in the world.
 The Incal (2005)
 Volume 1:The Epic Conspiracy (160 pages, Humanoids/DC Comics, January 2005); Softcover trade edition, collecting volumes 1–3 from the French original source publications, including "Metabaron 1: The Lost Pages" as "Solune's Origin".
 Volume 2:The Epic Journey (160 pages, Humanoids/DC Comics, June 2005); Softcover trade edition, collecting volumes 4–6 from the French original source publications.
 The Incal anthology collections (2010–2019)
 The Incal Classic Collection (308 pages, Humanoids Inc, December 2010); To 750 copies limited oversized hardcover edition in hardboard slipcase.
 The Incal Classic Collection (308 pages, Humanoids Inc, June 2011); Hardcover trade edition, reprinted in May 2012, and April 2013.
 The Incal (316 pages, Humanoids Inc, September 2014); Hardcover trade edition, essentially a reprint, but featuring new introductions.
 The Incal (324 pages, Humanoids Inc, February 2019); To 1550 copies limited oversized two-volume hardcover collector's edition in deluxe hardboard slipcase.
 The Incal (320 pages, Humanoids Inc, August 2020)); "Exclusive Direct Market Edition" softcover trade edition with deviant cover.
 The Incal (320 pages, Humanoids Inc, September 2020)); Softcover trade edition.
 The Incal (320 pages, Humanoids Inc, January 2022)); Oversized deluxe black & white edition.The Incal anthology collections (2011 licensed UK editions)
 The Incal Classic Collection (308 pages, Titan Books, May 2011); Hardcover trade edition.
 The Incal (308 pages, SelfMadeHero, October 2011); Hardcover trade edition.
 The Incal individual volumes (2013–2017); The six, 2013–2014, single title volumes, are each executed as a, to 999 copies limited, hardcover coffee table edition.
 Volume 1: The Black Incal (48 pages, Humanoids Inc, January 2013) 
 Volume 2: The Luminous Incal (48 pages, Humanoids Inc, March 2013)
 Volume 3: What Lies Beneath (56 pages, Humanoids Inc, May 2013)
 Volume 4: What Is Above (60 pages, Humanoids Inc, August 2013)
 Volume 5: The Fifth Essence Part One: The Dreaming Galaxy (48 pages, Humanoids Inc, November 2013)
 Volume 6: The Fifth Essence Part Two: Planet Difool (48 pages, Humanoids Inc, January 2014)
 Volume 1: The Incal - FCBD 2017 (32 pages, Humanoids Inc, May 2017); truncated standard US comic book version of volume 1 as Humanoids' first "Free Comic Book Day" offering.Madwoman of the Sacred Heart (2010–2022)
With the translation of volume 3 of the series, "The Sorbonne's Madman", these anthology collections complete the series.
 Madwoman of the Sacred Heart (192 pages, Humanoids Inc, December 2010); Hardcover trade edition in dust jacket.
 Madwoman of the Sacred Heart (192 pages, Humanoids Inc, February 2012); Softcover trade edition.
 Madwoman of the Sacred Heart (192 pages, Humanoids Inc, September 2013); Hardcover trade edition with deviant cover.
 Madwoman of the Sacred Heart (192 pages, Humanoids Inc, September 2022); Oversized hardcover edition, but essentially a reprint of the 2013 edition.

"The Eyes of the Cat" (2011–2013)The Eyes of the Cat (56 pages, Humanoids Inc, December 2011); To 750 copies limited hardcover coffee table format edition with black & white art featured on white paper.The Eyes of the Cat (56 pages, Humanoids Inc, August 2012); Hardcover trade edition with black & white art featured on white paper.The Eyes of the Cat (56 pages, Humanoids Inc, June 2013); "Yellow edition" with deviant cover, hardcover trade edition with black & white art featured on yellow paper as originally published in French (and as published in Taboo 4).
	 
"Angel Claws" (2013-2019)
Essentially a reissue of the 1997 Eurotica title, but on this occasion issued without a dust jacket, using the plural for the title, and featuring a deviant cover.
 Angel Claws (72 pages, Humanoids Inc, March 2013); To 800 copies limited black & white hardcover coffee table format edition.
 Angel Claws (72 pages, Humanoids Inc, March 2019); Hardcover trade edition.Final Incal (2014-2022)	
Though this three-volume series (originally called Après l'Incal – After the Incal) was ultimately realized with art from José Ladrönn, Giraud had actually already penciled the first outing in the series, "Le nouveau rêve", but which was replaced by a re-scripted and by Ladronn redrawn variant for reprint runs. The anthology editions below however, feature the Moebius 56-page original as well as a bonus. Actually, the series was from the start intended to be a purely Jodorowsky/Moebius follow-up to their acclaimed main series, but as stated above, it was Giraud who declined to continue afterwards.
 Final Incal (216 pages, Humanoids Inc, May 2014); To 200 copies limited coffee table format edition in hardboard slipcase, issued with three art prints and a by Jodorowsky and Ladrönn signed and numbered bookplate.
 Final Incal (216 pages, Humanoids Inc, May 2014); To 1500 copies limited oversized format edition in hardboard slipcase.
 The Jodorowsky Library, Volume 3 (416 pages, Humanoids Inc, August 2022); Hardcover trade edition.

"Deconstructing The Incal" (2017)
An illustrated reference book dealing with the Incal universe. Faithful reproduction of the 2016 second, updated and expanded edition of the 1989 French "Les Mystères de l'Incal" original, but without the "Au coeur de l'inviolable meta bunker" short story in its original coloring, which was however published by the publisher in July 2020 as a digital release under its English title "In the Heart of the Impregnable Metabunker" (aka "Solune's Origin" as the story was coined by the publisher in its 2005 co-publication with DC).
 "Deconstructing The Incal" (112 pages, Humanoids Inc, October 2017); Oversized hardcover trade edition.

Various
"Buffalo Bill, Scout and Frontiersman" (1968)
Earliest known English book publication with art by Giraud, faithful reproduction of the French original.Buffalo Bill, Scout and Frontiersman (68 pages, Feltham:Odhams Books, Ltd, 1968); illustrated hardcover textbook in European graphic novel format.

"Project Pendulum" (1987)
An illustrated hardback science fiction novel with dust jacket written by Robert Silverberg and therefore a USA original. The by Mœbius illustrated book has as such seen reciprocally a translation in native French as a mass paperback release in 's SF pocketbook collection (#3059) in 1991, with a reprint in 1994.
 "Project Pendulum" (200 pages, New York City:Walker & Company, September 1987)The Magic Crystal (1989–1990)
Executed as softcovers in the European graphic novel format.
 #1 - The Magic Crystal (48 pages, New York City:Catalan Communications, September 1989)
 #2 - Island of the Unicorn (48 pages, Catalan Communications, February 1990)
 #3 - Aurelys's Secret (48 pages, Catalan Communications, May 1990)

"Eyes of the Cat" (1990)
For unknown reasons, this 54-page work had been left out of the Marvel/Epic collection of the 1980s–1990s, despite the fact that the work was hailed by comic critics as a graphic masterpiece. Still, the story did see a contemporary first-time English-language publication, with elaborate annotations from its authors, in this graphic novel anthology. The black & white Mœbius story was as only one printed on yellow paper, like it was in the original French source publication. The anthology featured the rejected Les Chiens 1979 movie poster by Mœbius as cover. In the 2010s reissued several times by Humanoides Publishing as specified above. Taboo 4 (168 pages, Wilmington, VT:Spiderbaby Grafix & Publications, January 1990); black & white softcover trade paperbackThe Mœbius Portfolio (1990)
By Lofficier coined section name (1 illustrated page) for the three Moebius contributions to this British graphic novel anthology, which consisted of "In the heart of the impregnable meta-bunker" (8 pages, first time English language publication), "Carnet 3: The Mœbius Sketchbook" (8 pages), and "Mœbius Circa '74" (8 pages). Giraud provided the promotional poster art for this outing, but not the cover.A1: Book Four (96 pages, London: Atomeka Press, April 1990); black & white softcover trade paperbackMœbius Collector Cards (1993)Mœbius Collector Cards trading card set (Saddle Brook, NJ: Comic Images, 1993); basic set of 90 cards plus 6 chase "Chromium Cards", original US release without any other (-language) editions.

"Mœbius: a retrospective" (1995)
A to 2500 copies limited exposition catalog for the similarly named exhibition at the Cartoon Art Museum, listed above.
 Mœbius: a retrospective (40 pages, San Francisco: Cartoon Art Museum, April 1995); standard American softcover comic book formatMœbius ashcan comics' (1995-1999)
A publication by Giraud's own American publisher, and therefore not only an American original, but also a typical company release, to wit a limited, collector's edition intended for sale at comic conventions. The mini-series collected hitherto unpublished art and shorts, and were edited by the company's co-shareholder J.M. Lofficier after the artist's return to native France.
 #1 - Moebius ashcan comics 1 (16 pages, Los Angeles:Starwatcher Graphics, 1995); black & white standard American comic book format, limited to 250 numbered copies + 25 "artist proofs" (AP) with embossed publisher seal
 #2 - Moebius ashcan comics presents: Ratman (16 pages, Los Angeles:Starwatcher Graphics, 1995); black & white standard American comic book format, limited to 250 numbered copies + 25 "artist proofs" (AP) with embossed publisher seal
 #3 - Moebius ashcan comics presents: Dune (16 pages, Starwatcher Graphics, 1995); black & white standard American comic book format, limited to 100 numbered copies + 25 "artist proofs" (AP) with embossed publisher seal; featuring storyboards and conceptart for Jodorowsky's abandoned Dune movie project
 #4 - Moebius ashcan comics 4 (16 pages, Starwatcher Graphics, 1997); black & white standard American comic book format, limited to 100 numbered copies + 25 "artist proofs" (AP) with embossed publisher seal
 #5 - Moebius ashcan comics presents: Coffee Dreams (16 pages, Starwatcher Graphics, 1997); black & white standard American comic book format, limited to 100 numbered copies + 25 "artist proofs" (AP) with embossed publisher seal
 #6 - Moebius ashcan comics presents: Crystal Dream (16 pages, Starwatcher Graphics, 1998); black & white standard American comic book format, limited to 100 numbered copies + 25 "artist proofs" (AP) with embossed publisher seal
 #7 - Moebius ashcan comics presents: Metreon (16 pages, Starwatcher Graphics, 1999); "special color issue" standard American comic book format in wraparound cover, limited to 100 numbered copies + 25 "artist proofs" (AP) with embossed publisher sealMœbius Comics (1996–1997)
Interior art executed in black & white, the series features a reprint of The Man from the Ciguri, but also new, and previously unseen Mœbius comics and art. Noteworthy are his storyboards for the abandoned Internal Transfer movie. Also featured in the series is a black & white version of the short story "The Still Planet", previously published in Concrete Celebrates Earth Day 1990, but this version sporting a different last page. J.M. Lofficier reprised his role as series editor for these comic book outings.
 Issue 1 (32 pages, Wayne County, MI:Caliber Comics, May 1996)
 Issue 2 (32 pages, Caliber Comics, July 1996)
 Issue 3 (32 pages, Caliber Comics, September 1996)
 Issue 4 (32 pages, Caliber Comics, November 1996)
 Issue 5 (32 pages, Caliber Comics, January 1997)
 Issue 6 (32 pages, Caliber Comics, March 1997); in wraparound cover.

"Angel Claw" (1997)
Due to the graphic, erotic nature of the book, this work of Moebius has not been published in the US in the 1990s by the "usual suspects", but rather by outlier NBM Publishing under its "Eurotica" imprint, as a European A4 format padded hardcover in dust jacket book. In the 2010s reissued several times by Humanoides Publishing as specified above.
 Angel Claw (72 pages, New York City:Eurotica, February 1997); black & white.

"The story of an idea" (2007)
A ten-page promotional brochure, featuring an eight-page comic by Giraud as Mœbius, detailing the history and aims of the International Red Cross and Red Crescent Movement. Especially created for the organization, the full color, standard European comic album sized, brochure was widely disseminated by the organization in French, English, Mandarin, Arabic and Spanish. The English language edition enjoyed a first print run of 48,000 copies, augmented with a 40,000 copy reprint run in May 2009.The story of an idea (10 pages, Geneva:International Federation of Red Cross and Red Crescent Societies, December 2007)XIII (2013)
 #18 - The Irish Version (48 pages, Canterbury:Cinebook, April 2013)

Filmographynote: listed are only the feature-length movie productions Alien (1979)
 The Time Masters (1982)
 Tron (1982)
 Masters of the Universe (1987)
 Willow (1988)
 The Abyss (1989)
 Little Nemo: Adventures in Slumberland (1989)
 The Fifth Element (1997) – The production design for the film was developed by Giraud, his daughter Hélène, Jean-Claude Mézières, et al. Blueberry (2004) – On the DVD extras Giraud talks about the comic, the film etc., dressed in period costume he was wearing for his cameo.
 Thru the Moebius Strip (2005)
 Strange Frame (2012)

Video games
Video games on which Mœbius has participatedFade to Black (1995, box cover art only)Panzer Dragoon (1995, box cover art only)Pilgrim: Faith as a Weapon (1997, concept art)Seven Samurai 20XX (2004, character design)
Video games heavily inspired by Mœbius' art
An arcade and bar based on Giraud's work, called The Airtight Garage, was one of the original main attractions at the Metreon in San Francisco when the complex opened in 1999. It included three original games: Quaternia, a first-person shooter networked between terminals and based on the concept of "junctors" from Major Fatal and The Airtight Garage; a virtual reality bumper cars game about mining asteroids; and Hyperbowl, an obstacle course bowling game incorporating very little overtly Moebius imagery. The arcade was closed and reopened as "Portal One", retaining much of the Moebius-based decor and Hyperbowl but eliminating the other originals in favor of more common arcade games.Jet Set Radio Future - the artwork and graphics of the game are inspired by the artist's work. (2002)Gravity Rush - the artwork and graphics of the game are inspired by the artist's work. Sable (video game) is heavily inspired by Moebius artwork (2021).Rollerdrome is a third-person shooter with rollerskating and Moebius inspired visuals from OlliOlli creator, Roll7 (2022)Swordship is a futuristic dodge'em up where the player's vehicle is to evade the enemies and trick them into destroying each other. The minimalist graphics' colour tone looks close to the Moebius comics (2022)Aquamarine - the artwork is inspired by the artist's work. (2022)Synergy is a colony sim set on a fictional arid exoplanet with strong, bright Moebius-esque visuals (2023)

 Documentaries 
 1987: The Masters of Comic Book Art – Documentary by Ken Viola (60 min.)
 1994:  – Documentary by Louis Mouchet. Giraud and Alejandro Jodorowsky on The Incal and their abandoned film adaptation of Frank Herbert's Dune. During the psycho-genealogical session that concludes the film, Giraud impersonates Mouchet's father (88 min. and 52 min.)
 French SECAM tape release in 1997
 British, French, Italian and Spanish 1-disc DVD releases in 2007
 1994: Blueberry – Documentary by Christophe Heili (Cendranes Films for Canal+/TVCF, October, 27 min.)
 1997: Jean [Gir]aud's - Documentary by Hervé Eparvier (Stardom, Paris, 22 min.). Documentary produced on the occasion of the September 1996 Blueberry exposition at Stardom Gallery. The documentary title is a play on the title of the "Blueberry's" artbook, slated for release at the time.
 French SECAM tape release in 1997, included as bonus for the boxed, limited edition of the artbook "Blueberry's"
 2000: Mister Gir & Mike S. Blueberry – Documentary by Damian Pettigrew. Giraud executes numerous sketches and watercolors for the Blueberry album, "Géronimo l'Apache", travels to Saint Malo for the celebrated comic-book festival, visits his Paris editor Dargaud, and in the film's last sequence, does a spontaneous life-size portrait in real time of Geronimo on a large sheet of glass (Musée de la Bande dessinée d'Angoulême, 55 min.)
 French SECAM tape release in 2000
 2002: Fellini: I'm a Born Liar – Documentary by Damian Pettigrew. Giraud conceived the poster for the documentary's 2003 North American release, reused as the cover for the American, Italian and French DVD releases, and appears in the DVD bonus extras of the French version.
 2005: The Visual Element - Special feature with Giraud and his friend and co-worker Jean-Claude Mézières discussing their production design work on the movie The Fifth Element (The Fifth Element - Ultimate Edition 2005 DVD; The Fifth Element 2015 4K Blu-ray, 18 min.)
 2007: Moebius Redux: A Life in Pictures – Biographical documentary by Hasko Baumann (Germany, England, Finland: Arte, BBC, ZDF, YLE, AVRO, 68 min.)
 Non-commercial, but licensed, Australian 1-disc DVD release in 2008
 German 2-disc DVD release in 2010, extended to 190 min.
 2007: Jean Van Hamme, William Vance et Jean Giraud à l'Abbaye de l'Épau – Institutional documentary (FGBL Audiovisuel, 70 min.)
 2010:  – Autobiographical portrait co-written by Jean Giraud and directed by Damian Pettigrew for the 2010 retrospective held at the Fondation Cartier for Contemporary Art in Paris (Fondation Cartier, CinéCinéma, 72 min.)
 French 1-disc DVD release in 2011, augmented with Pettigrew's 2000 Mister Gir & Mike S. Blueberry documentary.

Notes

 References 
 

Sources
; cover by Tardi, who returned the favor Giraud had provided him, when scripting one of his very first published comics.

; theme issue
; autobiography
; the vast majority of the featured artist's interviews, conducted by Svane, was originally published in French in the Swiss comic journal '', Hors-Séries (Moebius-themed) issue 2, 2000/Q1, but were augmented with material edited out in the original publication, as well as augmented with material from other, older source publications, especially opportune in the latter case for the by then deceased Jean-Michel Charlier.

 (May 2021 hardcover reprint)

External links

 
Jean Giraud (Gir, Moebius) French magazine publications in, Spirou, Pilote , L'Écho des savanes, Métal Hurlant , Fluide Glacial , (A SUIVRE) and BoDoï  BDoubliées 
Jean Giraud albums Bedetheque 
Moebius albums Bedetheque 
Jean Giraud on Bdparadisio.com 
Jean Giraud Moebius  on Artfacts.net, about the expositions of original drawings of Moebius. 
Moebius publications in English www.europeancomics.net 
Illustration Art Gallery

Twists of Fate on France magazine 
Moebius and the Key of Dreams  on Paris Review 
Jean Giraud profile  on Artfacts 
Giraud  on bpip.com 
Jean Giraud on Lambiek Comiclopedia 
 
 

Moebius on contours-art.de 
Interview Jean Giraud – The Eternal Traveler

French comic book illustrator Moebius dies in Paris by Radio France Internationale English service
 Moebius Interview - Virtual Reality – ArtFutura 
  

1938 births
2012 deaths
20th-century French artists
21st-century French artists
People from Nogent-sur-Marne
French comics artists
Science fiction artists
French speculative fiction artists
French military personnel of the Algerian War
Science Fiction Hall of Fame inductees
Will Eisner Award Hall of Fame inductees
World Fantasy Award-winning artists
Grand Prix de la ville d'Angoulême winners
Knights of the Ordre national du Mérite
Pseudonymous artists
Inkpot Award winners
Deaths from pulmonary embolism
Deaths from lymphoma
Deaths from cancer in France